= Salvator Mundi (painting) =

Painting attributed to Leonardo da Vinci

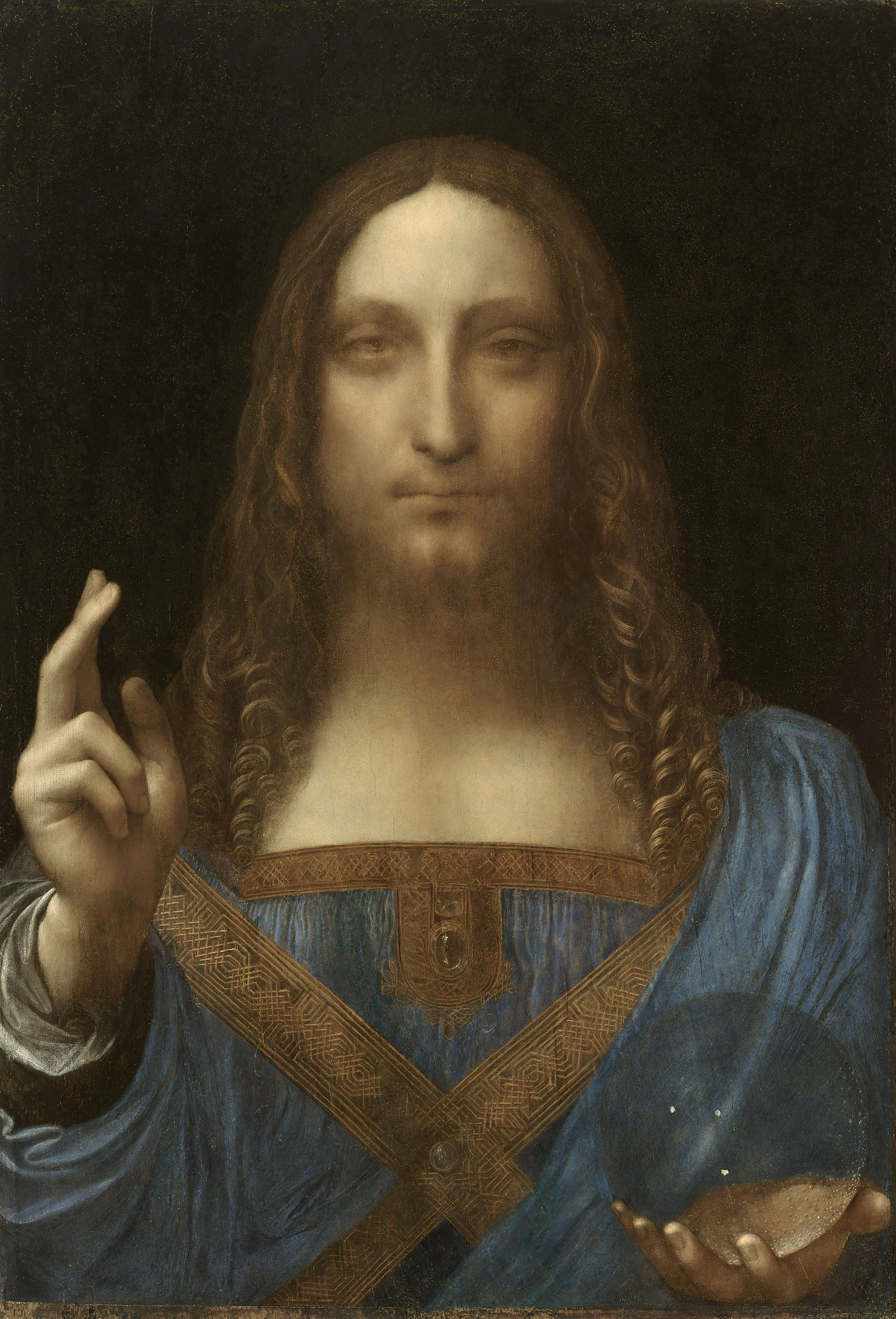
- Artist: Leonardo da Vinci (alone) or Leonardo with workshop participation
- Year: c. 1499–1510 (Note: Scholars date the painting to c. 1499–1510: Syson et al. (2011, p. 95): c. 1499 onward; Kemp (2019, p. 149): c. 1504–1510; Zöllner (2019, p. 250): c. 1507 or later)
- Type: Oil on walnut panel
- Dimensions: 45.7 cm × 65.7 cm (25.8 in × 19.2 in)
- Owner: Acquired by Abu Dhabi's Department of Culture and Tourism for the Louvre Abu Dhabi. Currently owned by Mohammad bin Salman.

Salvator Mundi (Latin for 'Savior of the World') is a painting attributed in whole or part to the Italian High Renaissance artist Leonardo da Vinci, dated c. 1499–1510. Long thought to be a copy of a lost original veiled with overpainting, it was rediscovered, restored, and included in an exhibition of Leonardo's work at the National Gallery, London, in 2011–2012. Christie's, which sold the work in 2017, stated that most leading scholars consider it an original work by Leonardo, but this attribution has been disputed by some leading specialists who propose that he only contributed certain elements; others believe that the extensive restoration prevents a definitive attribution.

The painting depicts Jesus Christ in anachronistic blue Renaissance attire, making a gesture of blessing with his right hand, while holding a transparent, non-refracting crystal orb in his left, signalling his role as Salvator Mundi and representing the celestial sphere of the heavens. Approximately thirty copies and variations of the work by pupils and followers of Leonardo have been identified; two are considered to have been produced during Leonardo's lifetime. Two preparatory chalk and ink drawings of the drapery by Leonardo are held in the British Royal Collection.

The painting was sold at auction for US$450.3 million on 15 November 2017 by Christie's in New York to Prince Badr bin Abdullah Al Saud, setting a new record for the most expensive painting ever sold at public auction. Although Prince Badr allegedly made the purchase on behalf of Abu Dhabi's Department of Culture and Tourism, shortly afterwards it was reported that he was a stand-in bidder for his close ally, the Saudi Arabian Crown Prince Mohammed bin Salman. The painting has not been publicly exhibited since the 2017 Christie's auction, and since late 2020 has been in storage in Saudi Arabia reportedly awaiting a museum and cultural center to be completed in Al-'Ula.

== History ==
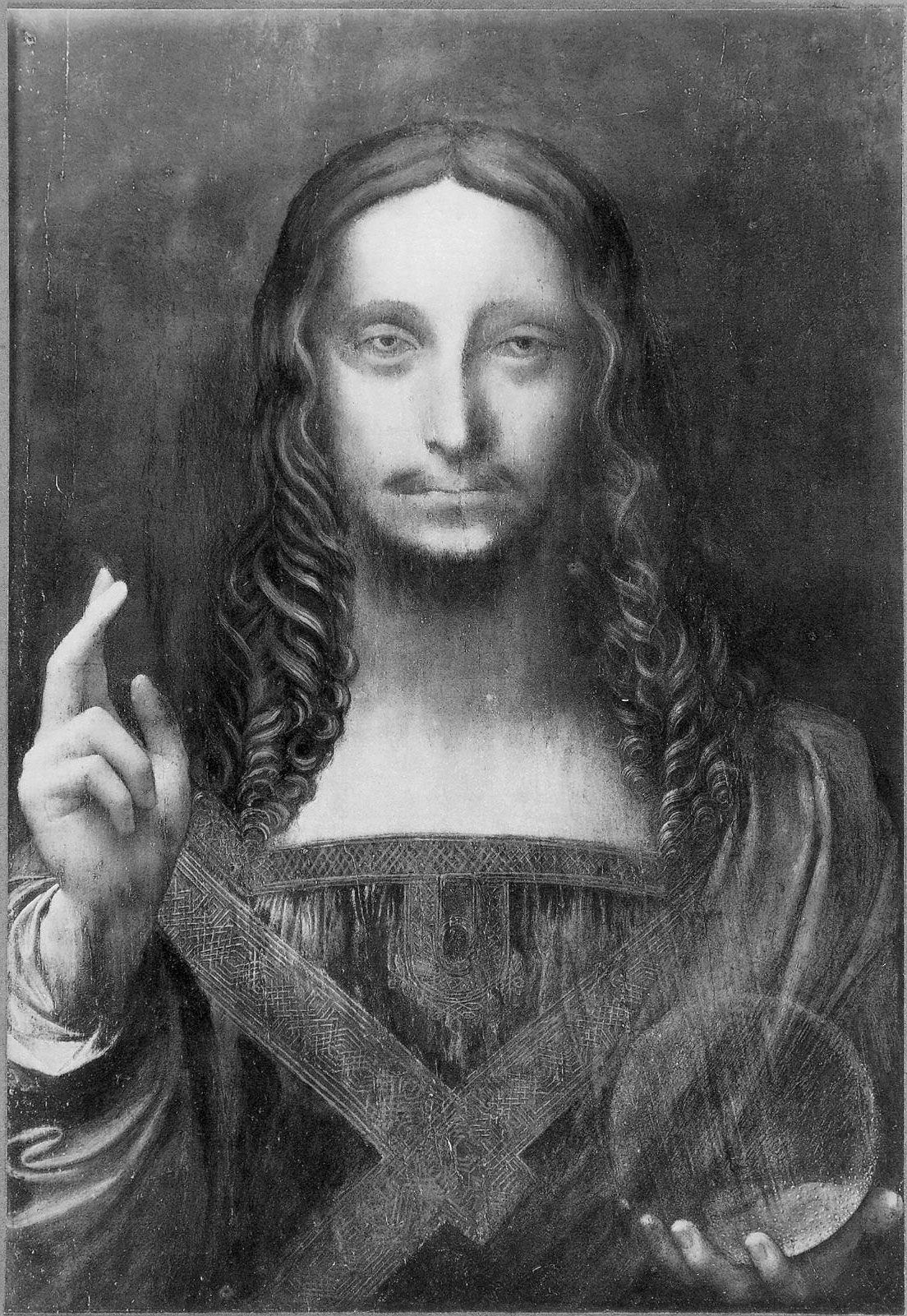
c. 1908–1910 photograph showing overpainting

=== Sixteenth century ===
Art historians have suggested several possibilities for when the work was executed and who the patron may have been. Christie's stated that the painting was probably commissioned around 1500, shortly after King Louis XII of France conquered the Duchy of Milan and took control of Genoa in the Second Italian War; Leonardo himself moved from Milan to Florence in 1500. The art historian Luke Syson agrees, dating the painting to c. 1499, though Martin Kemp and Frank Zöllner date the work to c. 1504–1510 and c. 1507 or later, respectively. Based on their similarity in style and materials to the studies for The Virgin and Child with Saint Anne, Carlo Pedretti dates the drapery studies in the Royal Collection, and thus the painting, to 1510–1515.

Because of the specificity of the subject, Leonardo's Salvator Mundi was most likely commissioned by a specific patron rather than produced on speculation. Isabella d'Este, Marchioness of Mantua, is cited as a possible patron as in 1504 she had wished to commission from Leonardo a "youthful Christ of around twelve years, of that age that he had when he disputed in the Temple", though Salvator Mundi shows a more mature Christ. (Note: Isabella d'Este was known to have commissioned a Salvator Mundi for her collection.) Carlo Pedretti notes that Isabella d'Este was a guest of Leonardo's patron Giuliano de' Medici in 1514 and so may have convinced the artist to complete the commission at that time. Frank Zöllner has discussed Leo X as a possible patron because the Salvator’s garments show some striking resemblances with Aimo’s marble statue of Leo X in Rome. Martin Kemp does not draw conclusions, but likewise discusses the possibility of Isabella d'Este as patron – though he also considers the Hungarian king Matthias Corvinus, Charles VIII of France, and others. Joanne Snow-Smith argued that Leonardo painted the Salvator Mundi for Louis XII of France and his consort, Anne of Brittany. This view was echoed by the British Royal Collection in their 2018 exhibition Leonardo da Vinci: A Life in Drawing and is supported by the early French provenance of many of the copies of the Salvator Mundi.

The painting would have been used in the context of personal devotion, as were other panels of this size and subject in the sixteenth century. Indeed, Snow-Smith emphasizes in her writings the devotional relationship that Louis XII and Anne of Brittany had with the Salvator Mundi as a subject (Note: To emphasize this relationship, when the de Ganay copy of the Salvator Mundi was exhibited in 1982, Snow-Smith had it framed in the form of a triptych altarpiece of the kind before which Louis XII and his consort Anne would have prayed. The model for this frame was based on Gerard Horenbout's illumination from folio 26 of the Book of Hours of James IV of Scotland and was carved by the seventh-generation Florentine frame-carver Roberto Tacchi.) and Frank Zöllner discussed the painting's relationship to French illuminated manuscripts in the practice of early sixteenth-century personal devotion and prayer.

It is possible that the painting was recorded in a 1525 inventory of Salaì's estate as "Christo in mondo de uno Dio padre", though it is unclear to which Salvator Mundi this might refer. The provenance of the painting breaks after 1530.

==== Origins ====
The Salvator Mundi as an image type predates Leonardo. Thus, Martin Kemp argues that on the one hand Leonardo was constrained in his composition by the expected iconography of the Salvator Mundi, but on the other hand, he was able to use the image as a vehicle for spiritual communication between the spectator and the likeness of Christ. The composition has its sources in Byzantine art, the imagery of which further developed in northern Europe before finding its place in the Italian states. (Note: The term "Salvator Mundi" was not widely applied to this image type during the sixteenth and seventeenth centuries. It was not until later that art historians came to use the term to describe this iconography.) Snow-Smith relates the development of the Salvator Mundi to Byzantine iconography and narratives of images of Christ "not made by human hands". Such acheiropoeta would include the Mandylion of Edessa, the Keramidion, and the Veil of Veronica. Although the Salvator Mundi has its origins in the acheiropoeta, Snow-Smith discusses, the Salvator Mundi emerged in the fifteenth century through such intermediate subjects as Christ as Pantocrator, Christ in Majesty, and the Last Judgment, which like the acheiropoeta betray their Byzantine origins through their frontal depictions of Christ. The frontality of Christ is shared by other images of Christ and God the Father in the fifteenth and sixteenth centuries, including in 'portrait' images of Christ, which feature only Christ at half-length and without the orb or blessing gesture, as well as in images of 'Christ Blessing' which does not show Christ holding an orb. Images of Christ holding a sphere became widely popular following Charlemagne's adoption of the globus cruciger and the scepter. (Note: The sphere, in particular, was a site where artists had some latitude for formal experimentation in the otherwise rigid and proscribed iconography. Spheres might appear as solid metal, transparent glass, as being plain or covered with a T-band, as containing water or landscapes, or as a terrestrial globe.) The earliest true Salvator Mundi images are found in northern Europe. (Note: An early example can be found on folio 32v Pentecost from the Ingeborg Psalter.) Indeed, the iconography of the Salvator Mundi came to fruition in paintings such as Robert Campin's Blessing Christ and Praying Virgin and in the central panel of Rogier van der Weyden's Braque Triptych, before such images became common in Italy later in the fifteenth century. (Note: For more discussion on this, see Dalivalle, Kemp & Simon (2019, pp. 76–77) and Snow-Smith (1982, p. 75)) Works by such artists as Antonello da Messina and his Christ Blessing betray the influence of Northern artists in the Italian states.

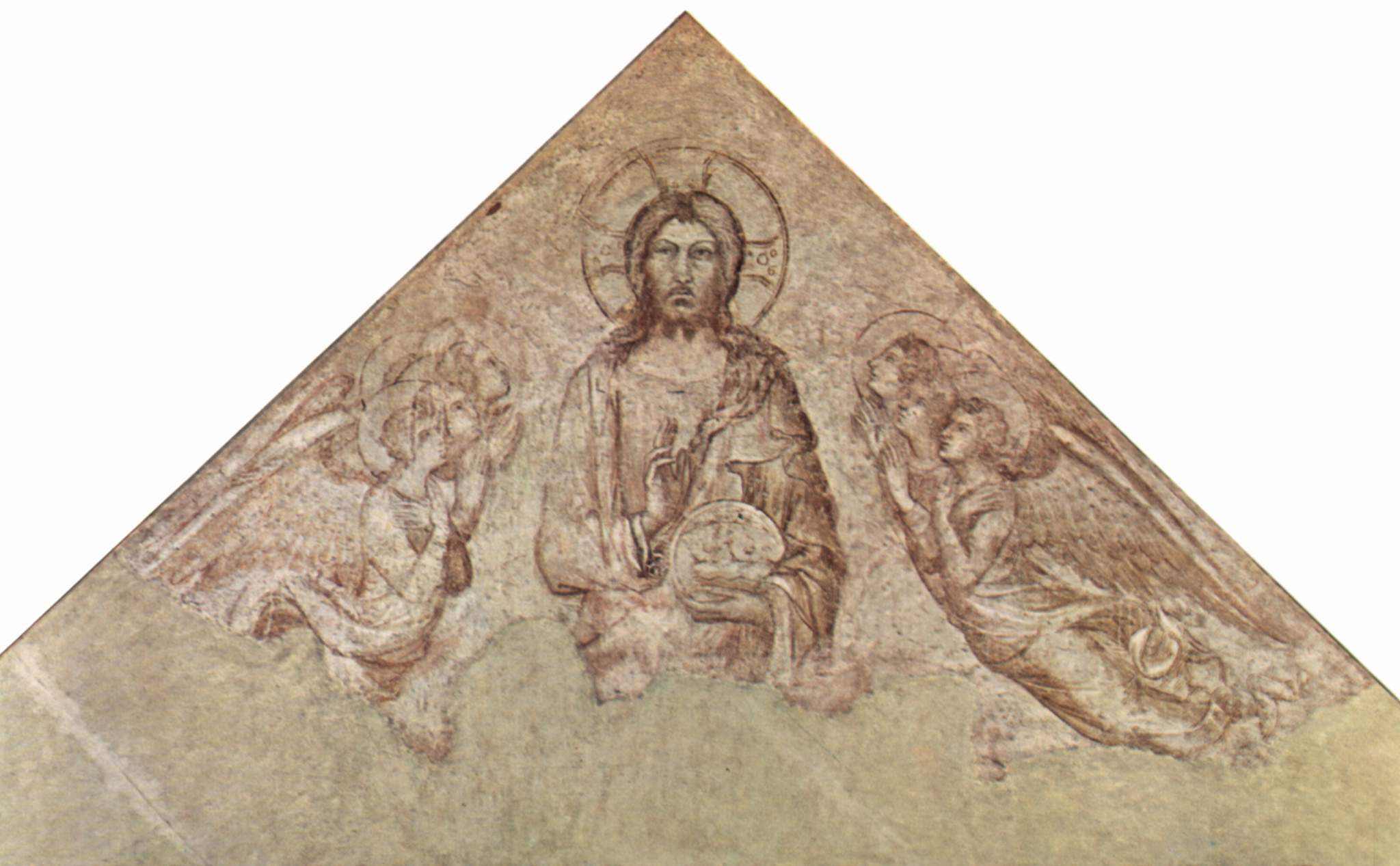
Simone Martini's Salvator Mundi Surrounded by Angels (c. 1341)

The earliest Italian example of a Salvator Mundi is likely to be Simone Martini's Salvator Mundi Surrounded by Angels at the Palais des Papes, Avignon. This image shows Christ at full length rather than the bust-length portrayals of later paintings of the Salvator Mundi. The image of Salvator Mundi later became well known in Italy, and especially Venice, through the archetype from Giovanni Bellini, now known only through copies. This includes Andrea Previtali's 1519 painting at the National Gallery, London. Another fifteenth-century example can be seen in the Palazzo Ducale in Urbino in the very damaged painting by Melozzo da Forlì. It has been suggested that Leonardo based his composition on this specific example. (Note: If Leonardo did use this painting as a model, it would suggest that Leonardo painted his Salvator Mundi no earlier that 1502 when he travelled to Urbino.)

==== Copies ====
The original painting by Leonardo was thought to have been destroyed or lost around 1603. There are at least thirty copies and variations of the painting executed by Leonardo's pupils and followers, as counted by Robert Simon. (Note: The first true accounting of these copies was in 1964 by the German scholar Ludwig Heydenreich, who was able to locate seven paintings.) The large number of these paintings is an important part of the pedigree of Leonardo's painting and emphasizes that there must have been an original by Leonardo from which they were copied. The most significant and widely discussed among these is the painting formerly in the de Ganay collection, as this one shares most closely the same composition and demonstrates the highest technical skill of Leonardo's pupils. This is so much the case that Joanne Snow-Smith proposed it to be the original painting in 1978. (Note: Snow-Smith does discuss the Cook collection Salvator Mundi, which she dismissed as an inferior copy as the painting's location was unknown at the time of her writing and she had only an early photograph showing significant overpainting with which to compare.) The many other copies found in Naples, Detroit, Warsaw, Zürich and other public and private collections contain various attributions to members of Leonardo's pupils and followers. Some versions differ significantly from the original. Two examples can be found in the form of a 'portrait' such as in Salaí's 1511 painting, as well as in a painting sold at Sotheby's on 5 December 2018, both of which use Leonardo's Salvator Mundi as their model but which do not employ the iconography of the blessing hand or globe. (Note: According to the lot essay accompanying the sale at Sotheby's, Cristina Geddo attributes this painting to a Milanese follower of Leonardo.) Other artists use the same model but for other subjects, as is the case with Leonardo's Spanish follower Fernando Yáñez de la Almedina and the Eucharistic Christ now at the Museo del Prado.

Leonardo's studio and his followers likewise produced at least four Salvator Mundi panels depicting a youthful Christ who is less frontal in his pose and who holds a terrestrial globe. (Note: The Apostle John in Leonardo's Last Supper is similarly depicted as feminine relative to Jesus.) These are largely from Leonardo's Milanese following rather than from members of his studio, (Note: The example in the Pushkin Museum is firmly known to have been in the collection of Charles I) though the variant in Rome can reasonably be attributed to his pupil Marco d'Oggiono. (Note: Another at the Museo Ideale Leonardo da Vinci had been attributed to Salaì, though Kemp notes that the quality of the painting is too poor to have come from a close member of Leonardo's circle.)

=== Seventeenth to nineteenth centuries ===
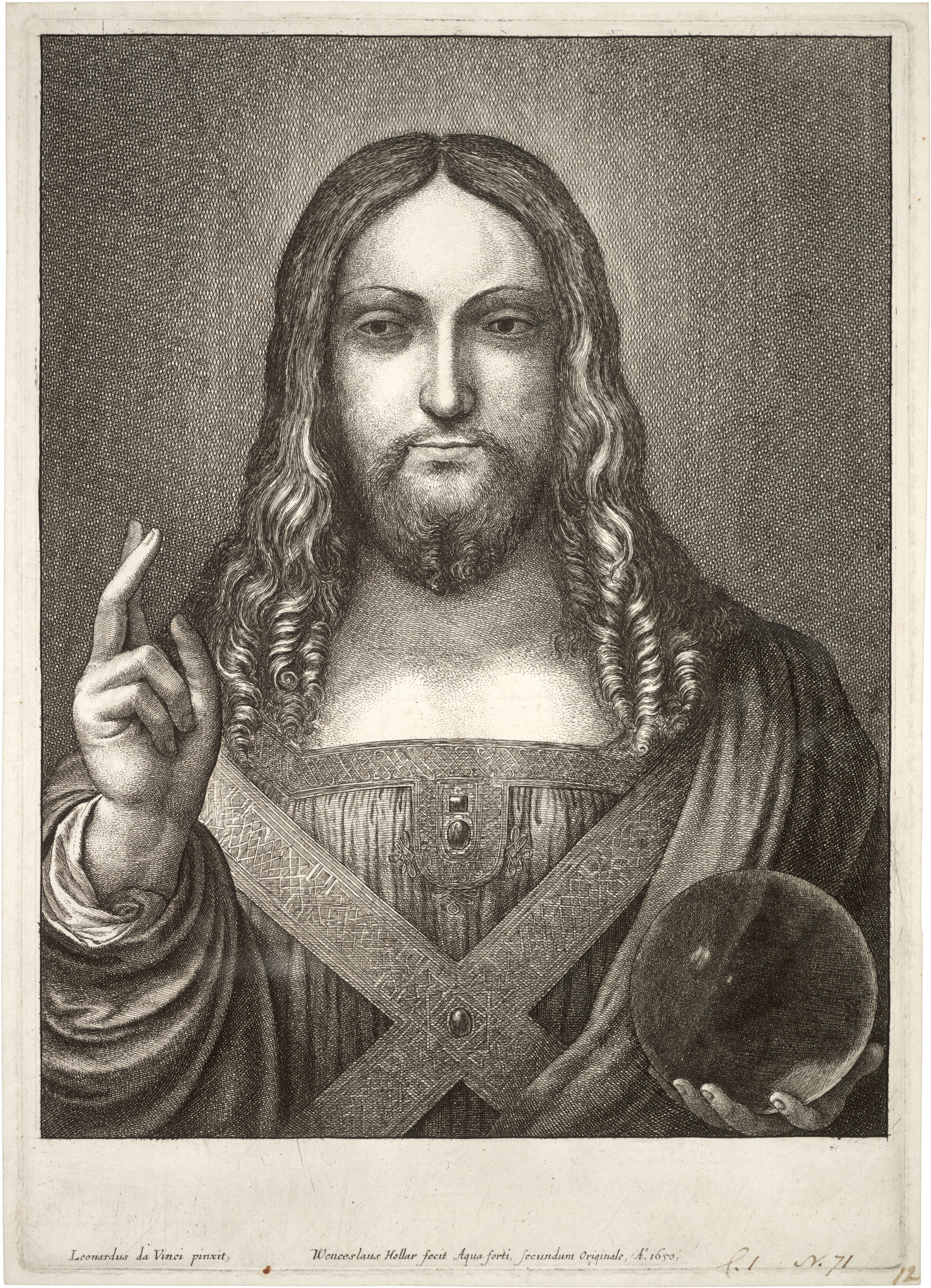
Wenceslaus Hollar, Salvator Mundi (1650), engraving, inscribed in Latin: "Leonardo da Vinci painted it, ... from the original", (Note: Leonardus da Vinci pinxit, Wenceslaus Hollar fecit Aqua forti, secundum originale, A°. 1650) Thomas Fisher Rare Book Library

This painting seems to have been at James Hamilton's Chelsea Manor in London from 1638 to 1641. After participating in the English Civil War, Hamilton was executed on 9 March 1649 and some of his possessions were taken to the Netherlands to be sold. The Bohemian artist Wenceslaus Hollar could have made his engraved copy, dated 1650, in Antwerp at that time. (Note: Hollar had also been in England from 1637 to 1646. He also may have simply copied a copy the painting.) It was also recorded in Henrietta Maria's possession in 1649, (Note: Some scholars claim that she might have had the painting when she moved from France and married Charles I in 1625, but this does not explain its being in Hamilton's possession from 1638 to 1641—although Hamilton may have simply possessed a different copy.) the same year her husband Charles I was executed, on 30 January. The painting was included in an inventory of the Royal Collection, (Note: Some scholars speculate that this could have been a copy, such as the one by Giampietrino.) valued at £30 (equivalent to £5,000 in 2025), and Charles's possessions were put up for sale under the English Commonwealth. The painting was sold to a creditor in 1651, returned to Charles II after the English Restoration in 1660, and included in an inventory of Charles's possessions at the Palace of Whitehall in 1666. It was inherited by James II, and may have remained with him until it passed to his mistress Catherine Sedley, whose illegitimate daughter with James became the third wife of John Sheffield, Duke of Buckingham. The duke's illegitimate son, Sir Charles Herbert Sheffield, auctioned the painting in 1763 along with other artworks from Buckingham House when the building was sold to George III.

The painting was probably placed in a gilded frame in the nineteenth century, in which it remained until 2005. It is probably the painting bought by the British collector Francis Cook in 1900 from J. C. Robinson for his collection at Doughty House in Richmond, London. The painting had been damaged by previous restoration attempts and was attributed to Bernardino Luini, a follower of Leonardo. Sir Francis Cook, 4th Baronet, Cook's great-grandson, sold it at auction in 1958 for £45 (equivalent to £900 in 2025) as a work by Leonardo's pupil Giovanni Antonio Boltraffio, to whom the painting remained attributed until 2011.

=== Rediscovery and restoration ===
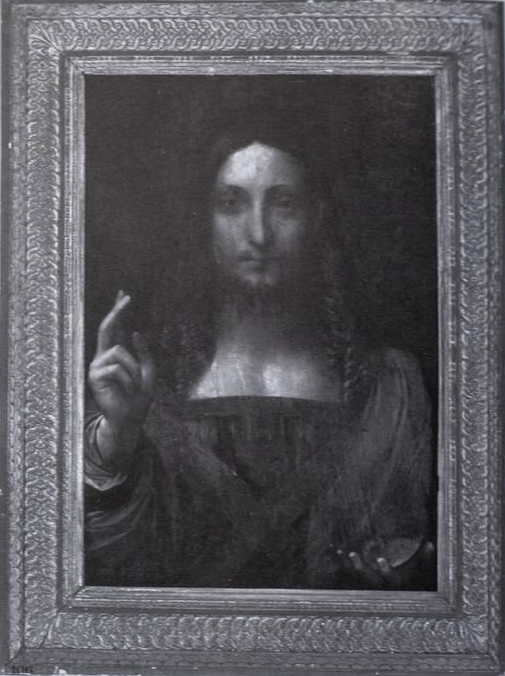
The painting as it appeared in a 2005 auction house catalogue, where it was listed as "After Leonardo da Vinci" and estimated at $1,200–$1,800

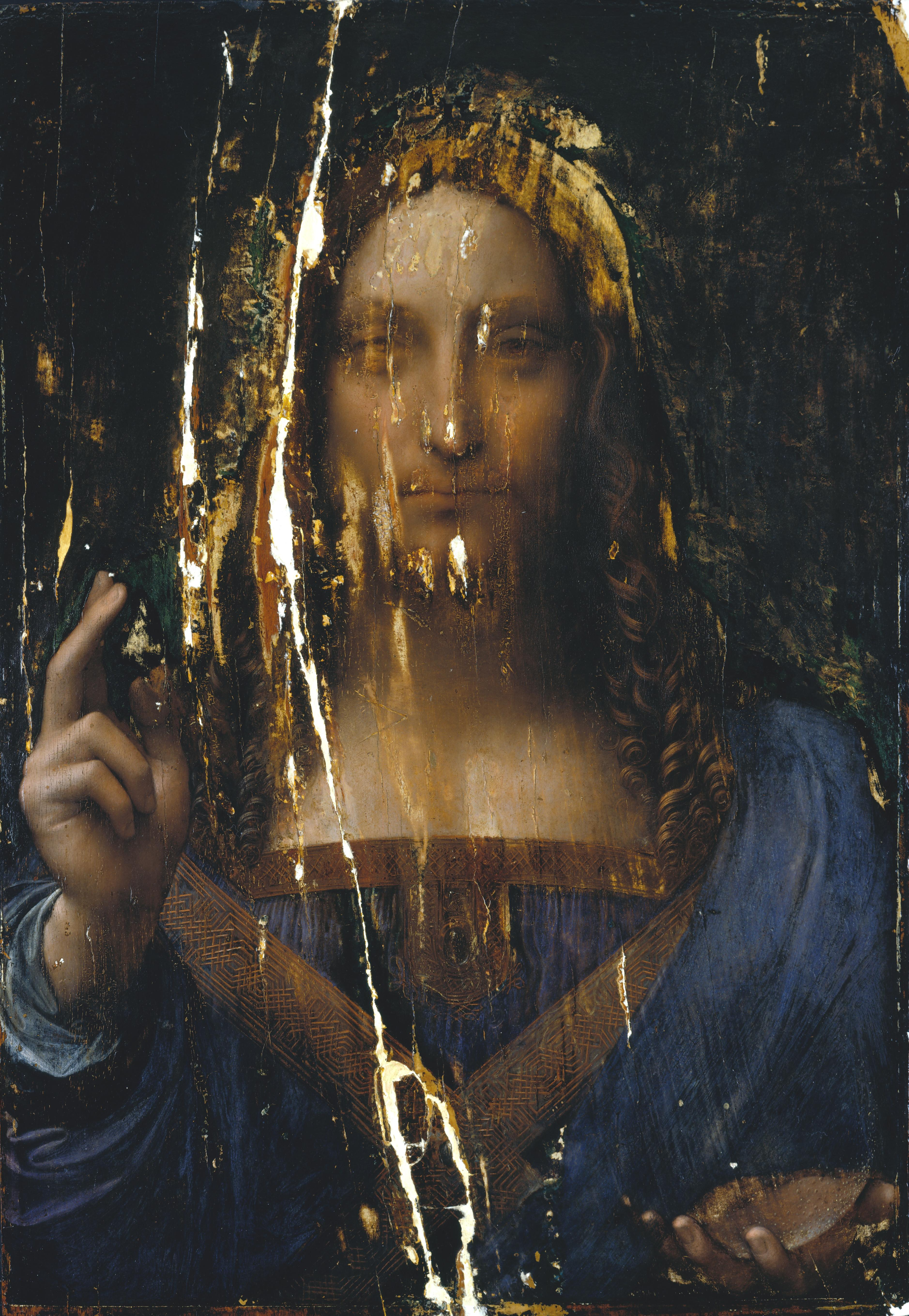
2006–07 photograph after cleaning (Note: Fragmentation caused by removal of worm-eaten auxiliary panel)

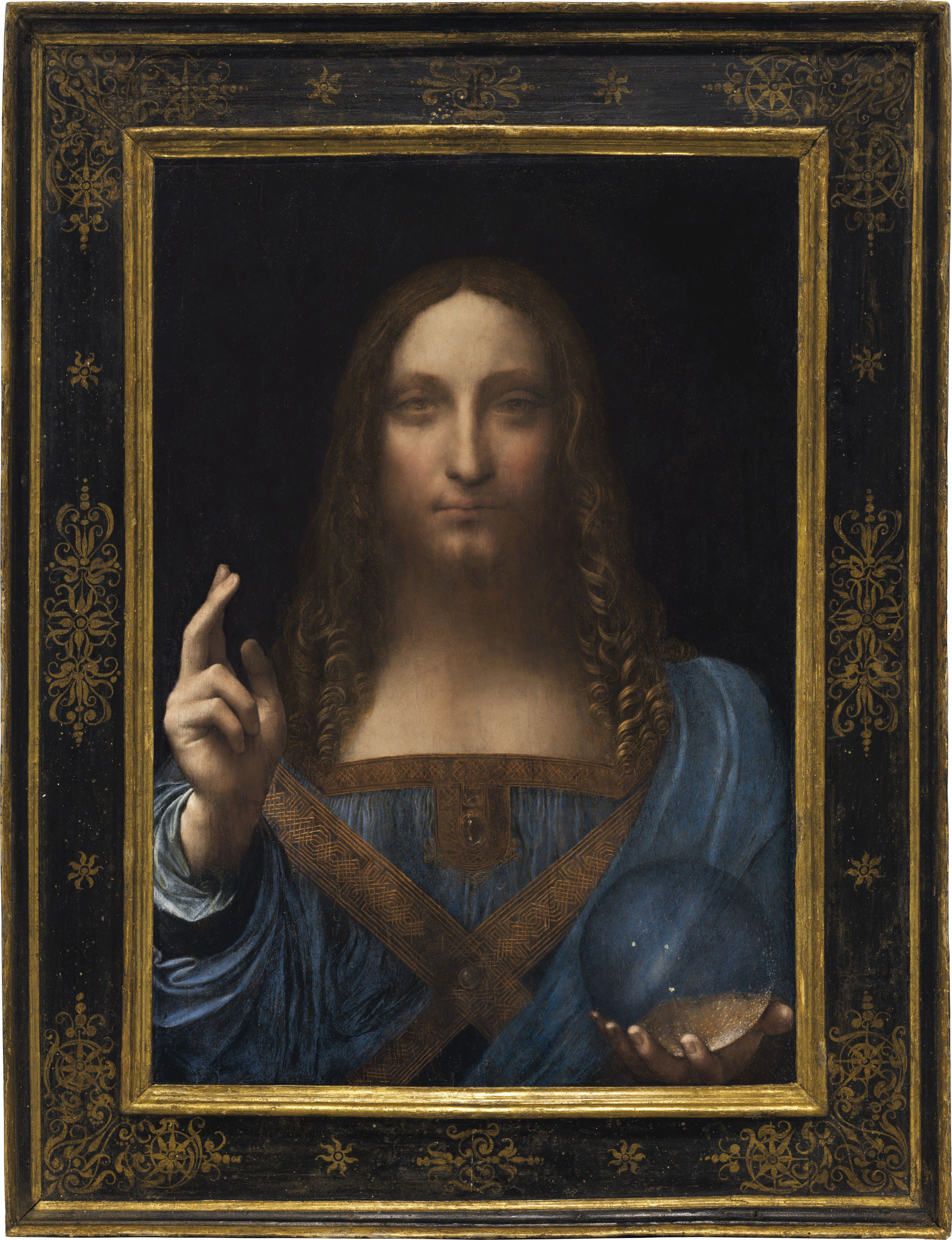
The painting after its modern restoration and framing

In 2005, the estate of Baton Rouge businessman Basil Clovis Hendry Sr. was auctioned by St. Charles Gallery in New Orleans. Lot 664 was titled "After Leonardo da Vinci: Christ Salvator Mundi". Art dealers Alexander Parish and Robert Simon, an Old Master specialist, bought it for $1,175 (equivalent to $1,937 in 2025).

The partners believed the painting might have a stronger provenance than advertised by the St. Charles Gallery. It was heavily overpainted and described by an expert as "a wreck, dark and gloomy". In April 2005, they commissioned Dianne Dwyer Modestini at New York University to oversee the restoration. Infrared photographs revealed a pentimento where the blessing hand's thumb is more upright. The artist's alteration of the thumb made it far less likely that the painting was a copy.

A woodworm-infested marouflage panel was on the back of the painting. When specialist Monica Griesbach removed it, the painting broke into seven pieces. Griesbach reassembled the painting with adhesive and wood slivers. In late 2006, Modestini began the restoration in earnest. During the process, she became convinced it was a genuine Leonardo. Her restoration was so extensive that Salvator Mundi has been called a "contemporary work" and a "masterpiece by Modestini". One historian joked that both thumbs in the initial painting "are rather better than the one painted by Dianne".

In 2010, Parish and Simon added Warren Adelson to their partnership in order to cover the costs of storage and insurance. London's National Gallery authenticated Salvator Mundi as an autograph work by Leonardo and exhibited it from November 2011 to February 2012. The Dallas Museum of Art held the painting for the remainder of 2012 in an attempt to lure donors to purchase the painting for its collection.

In 2013, Russian billionaire Dmitry Rybolovlev turned to Swiss art dealer Yves Bouvier to acquire the painting for his collection. Parish, Simon and Adelson sold Salvator Mundi to Bouvier for $80 million. Sotheby's brokered the sale, earning $3 million. Bouvier lied to Rybolovlev that negotiations were ongoing. Rybolovlev paid $127.5 million, unaware that he was purchasing the painting from Bouvier instead of its previous owners. The New York Times soon reported that Sotheby's brokered the sale for "between $75 and $80 million". Realizing Bouvier's fraud, Rybolovlev sued.

In 2016, the Salvator Mundi sellers sued Sotheby's over Bouvier's markup. The auction house denied knowing that Rybolovlev was the intended buyer. In 2018, Rybolovlev also sued Sotheby's for $380 million, alleging that the auction house was complicit in Bouvier's scheme. In January 2024, a US federal jury ruled in favour of Sotheby's, but Rybolovlev claimed credit for "shining a light on the lack of transparency that plagues the art market."

=== 2017 Christie's auction to present ===
Christie's took the painting on a promotional tour to Hong Kong, London, and San Francisco before its auction in New York on 15 November 2017. It sold for $400 million plus $50,312,500 in fees, setting a new record price for an artwork. The purchaser was identified as the Saudi Arabian Prince Badr bin Abdullah. In December 2017, The Wall Street Journal reported that Prince Badr was an intermediary for Crown Prince Mohammed bin Salman, but Christie's and Saudi officials re-stated that Prince Badr acted on behalf of Abu Dhabi's Department of Culture and Tourism for display at the Louvre Abu Dhabi in the United Arab Emirates.

In September 2018, the painting's scheduled exhibition at the Louvre Abu Dhabi was indefinitely postponed. Instead, in 2018 the Saudi crown prince secretly shipped the painting to Paris, on loan to curators at the Louvre, where it was analysed by the Centre for Research and Restoration of Museums of France and was expected to be hung in the Louvre's large Leonardo da Vinci exhibition which opened in October 2019. However the Saudi owners demanded that it be hung next to the Mona Lisa, which was impossible for security reasons, so the painting was shipped back to Saudi Arabia without appearing in the exhibition. The Louvre did not publicly comment on the matter, at the request of the owners, leading to speculation that the painting's absence from the exhibition was due to doubts about its attribution.

It hung in Crown Prince Mohammed bin Salman's yacht Serene until late 2020, when it was removed to a secret Saudi location while the yacht was in a Dutch shipyard for maintenance. The painting is being kept in storage until a new museum is built to house it; the museum and gallery will be in a complex called Wadi AlFann in Al-'Ula, which was expected to be completed in 2024.

== Attribution ==
=== Full attribution to Leonardo ===
About a year into her restoration effort, Dianne Dwyer Modestini noted that colour transitions in the subject's lips were "perfect" and that "no other artist could have done that". Upon studying the Mona Lisa for comparison, she concluded that "The artist who painted her was the same hand that had painted the Salvator Mundi". Since then, she has disseminated high-resolution images and technical information online for the scholarly community and public.

In 2006 Nicholas Penny, director of the National Gallery, wrote that he and some of his colleagues considered the work an autograph Leonardo, but that "some of us consider that there may be [parts] which are by the workshop". Penny conducted a side-by-side study of the Salvator Mundi and the Virgin of the Rocks in 2008. Martin Kemp later said of the meeting, "I left the studio thinking Leonardo must be heavily involved", and that "No one in the assembly was openly expressing doubt that Leonardo was responsible for the painting." In a 2011 consensus decision facilitated by Penny, the attribution to Leonardo was agreed upon unequivocally. By July 2011, separate press release documents were issued by the owners' publicity representative and the National Gallery, officially announcing the "new discovery".

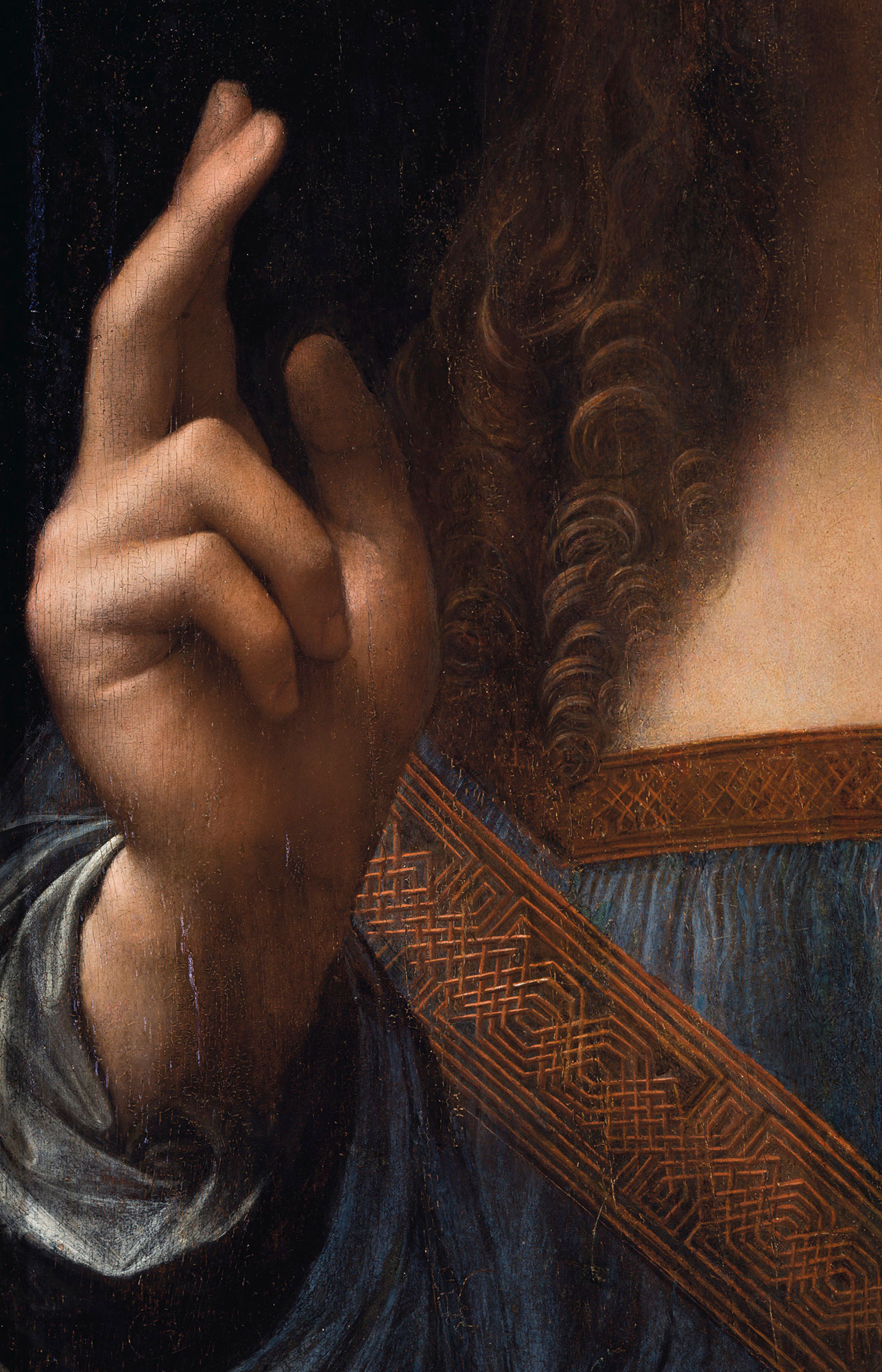
Christ's hands, the curls of his hair, and his drapery are well preserved, close to their original state.

Once it was cleaned and restored, the painting was compared with, and found superior to, twenty other versions of the composition. It was on display in the National Gallery's exhibition Leonardo da Vinci: Painter at the Court of Milan from November 2011 to February 2012. Several features in the painting have led to the positive attribution: a number of pentimenti are evident, most notably the position of the right thumb. The sfumato effect of the face—evidently achieved in part by manipulating the paint using the heel of the hand—is typical of many works by Leonardo. The way the ringlets of hair and the knotwork across the stole have been handled is also seen as indicative of Leonardo's style. The pigments and the walnut panel upon which the work was executed are consistent with other Leonardo paintings. The hands in the painting are very detailed, something for which Leonardo is known: he would dissect the limbs of cadavers to study them and rendered body parts in an extremely lifelike manner.

One of the world's leading Leonardo experts, Martin Kemp, who helped authenticate the work, said that he knew immediately upon first viewing the restored painting that it was the work of Leonardo: "It had that kind of presence that Leonardos have ... that uncanny strangeness that the later Leonardo paintings manifest." Of the better-preserved parts, such as the hair, Kemp notes: "It's got that kind of uncanny vortex, as if the hair is a living, moving substance, or like water, which is what Leonardo said hair was like". Kemp also states:

However skilled Leonardo's followers and imitators might have been, none of them reached out into such realms of "philosophical and subtle speculation". We cannot reasonably doubt that here, we are in the presence of the painter from Vinci.

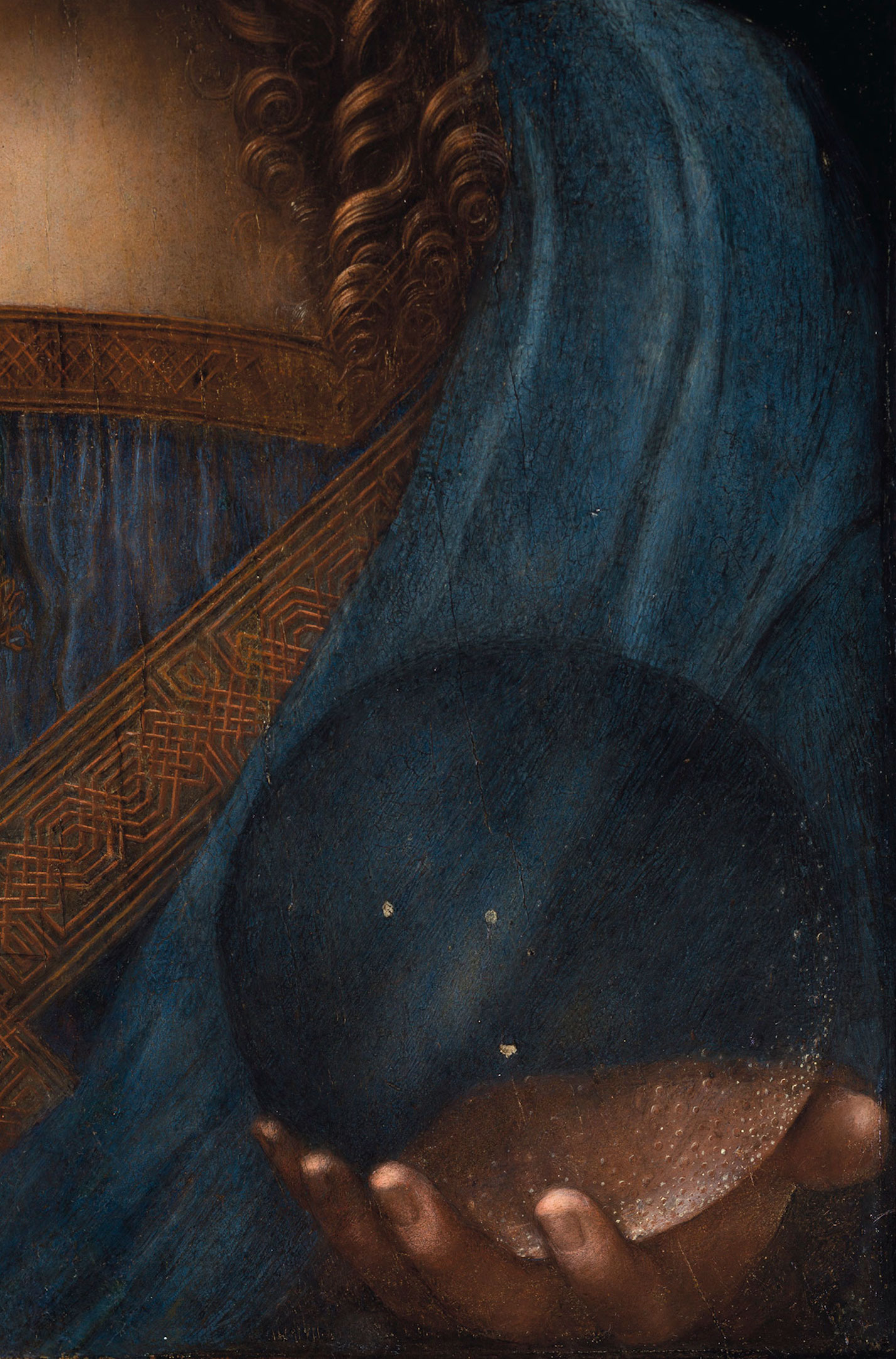
Pentimenti visible in the palm of the left hand shown through the transparent orb may be evidence of Leonardo's authorship.

In his biography of Leonardo, Walter Isaacson notes that the celestial sphere that Christ is holding does not correspond to the way such an orb would realistically look. It also shows no reflection. Isaacson writes that

In one respect, it is rendered with beautiful scientific precision, but Leonardo failed to paint the distortion that would occur when looking through a solid clear orb at objects that are not touching the orb. Solid glass or crystal, whether shaped like an orb or a lens, produces magnified, inverted, and reversed images. Instead, Leonardo painted the orb as if it were a hollow glass bubble that does not refract or distort the light passing through it.

Isaacson believes that this was "a conscious decision on Leonardo's part", and speculates that either Leonardo felt a more accurate portrayal would be distracting, or that "he was subtly trying to impart a miraculous quality to Christ and his orb." Kemp agrees that "To show the full effects of the sphere on the drapery behind would have been grotesque in a functioning devotional image". Kemp further states that the doubled outline of the heel of the hand holding the sphere—which the restorer described as a pentimento—is an accurate rendering of the double refraction produced by a transparent calcite (or rock crystal) sphere. However, this continues outside the globe itself. Kemp further notes that the orb "sparkles with a series of internal inclusions (or pockets of air)"—evidence in support of its being solid. More recently, the globe has been also interpreted as a magnifying instrument consisting of a vitreous globe filled with water (which in nature would also distort the background). André J. Noest suggests that the three painted specks represent celestial bodies.

Other versions or copies of the Salvator Mundi often depict a brass, solid spherical orb, terrestrial globe, or globus cruciger; occasionally, they appear to be made of translucent glass, or show landscapes within them. The orb in Leonardo's painting, Kemp says, has "an amazing series of glistening little apertures—they're like bubbles, but they're not round—painted very delicately, with just a touch of impasto, a touch of dark, and these little sort of glistening things, particularly around the part where you get the back reflections". These are the characteristic features of rock crystal, on which Leonardo was an avid expert. He had been asked to evaluate vases that Isabella d'Este (Note: One of several candidates proposed as a plausible subject of Leonardo's Mona Lisa, who owned a portrait of her drawn by Leonardo) had thought of purchasing, and greatly admired the properties of the mineral.

Iconographically, the crystal sphere relates to the heavens. In Ptolemaic cosmology, the stars were embedded in a fixed celestial crystalline sphere (composed of aether), with the spherical Earth at the center of the universe. "So what you've got in the Salvator Mundi", Kemp states, "is really 'a savior of the cosmos', and this is a very Leonardesque transformation."

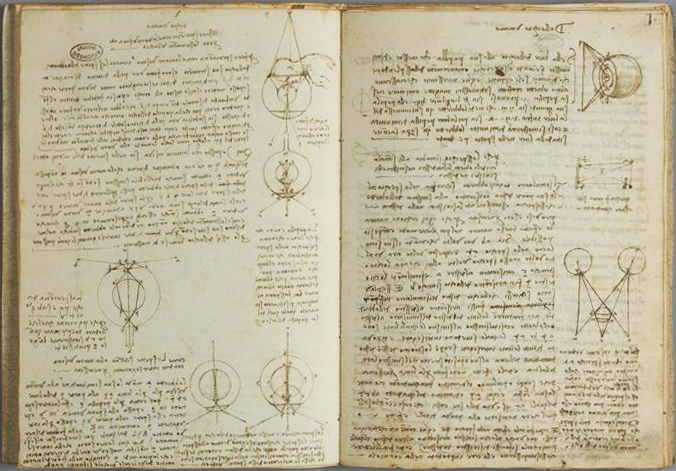
Leonardo's Paris Manuscript D, 1508–09

Another aspect of Leonardo's painting Kemp studied was the depth of field or shallow focus. Christ's blessing hand appears to be in sharp focus, whereas his face—though altered or damaged to some extent—is in soft focus. In his manuscript of 1508–1509 known as Paris Manuscript D, Leonardo explored theories of vision, optics of the eye, and theories relating to shadow, light, and colour. In the Salvator Mundi, he deliberately placed an emphasis on parts of the picture over others. Elements in the foreground are seen in focus, while elements further from the picture plane, such as the subject's face, are barely in focus. Paris Manuscript D shows that Leonardo was investigating this particular phenomenon around the turn of the century. Combined, the intellectual aspects, optical aspects, and the use of semi-precious minerals are distinctive features of Leonardo's oeuvre.

Preparatory studies
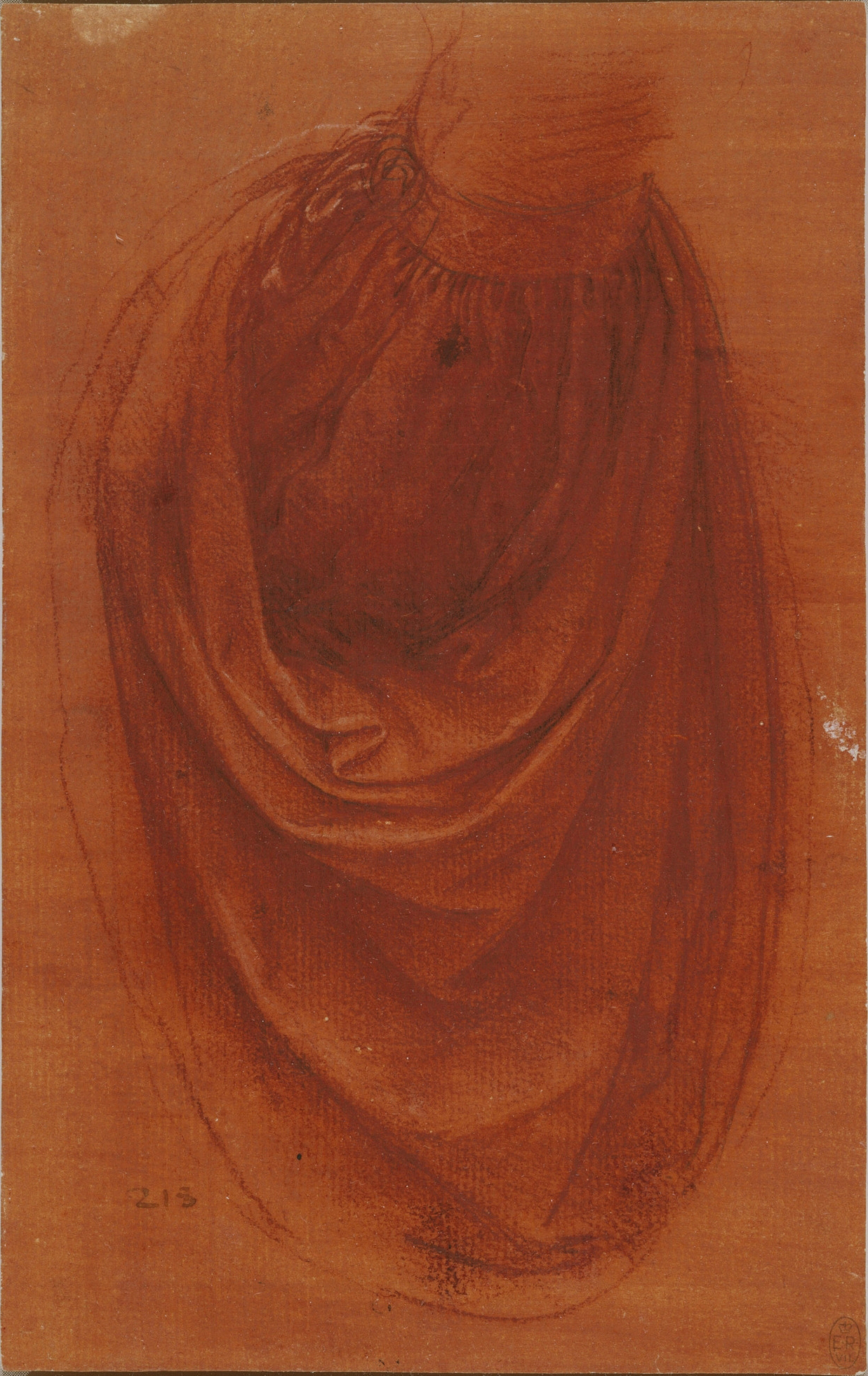
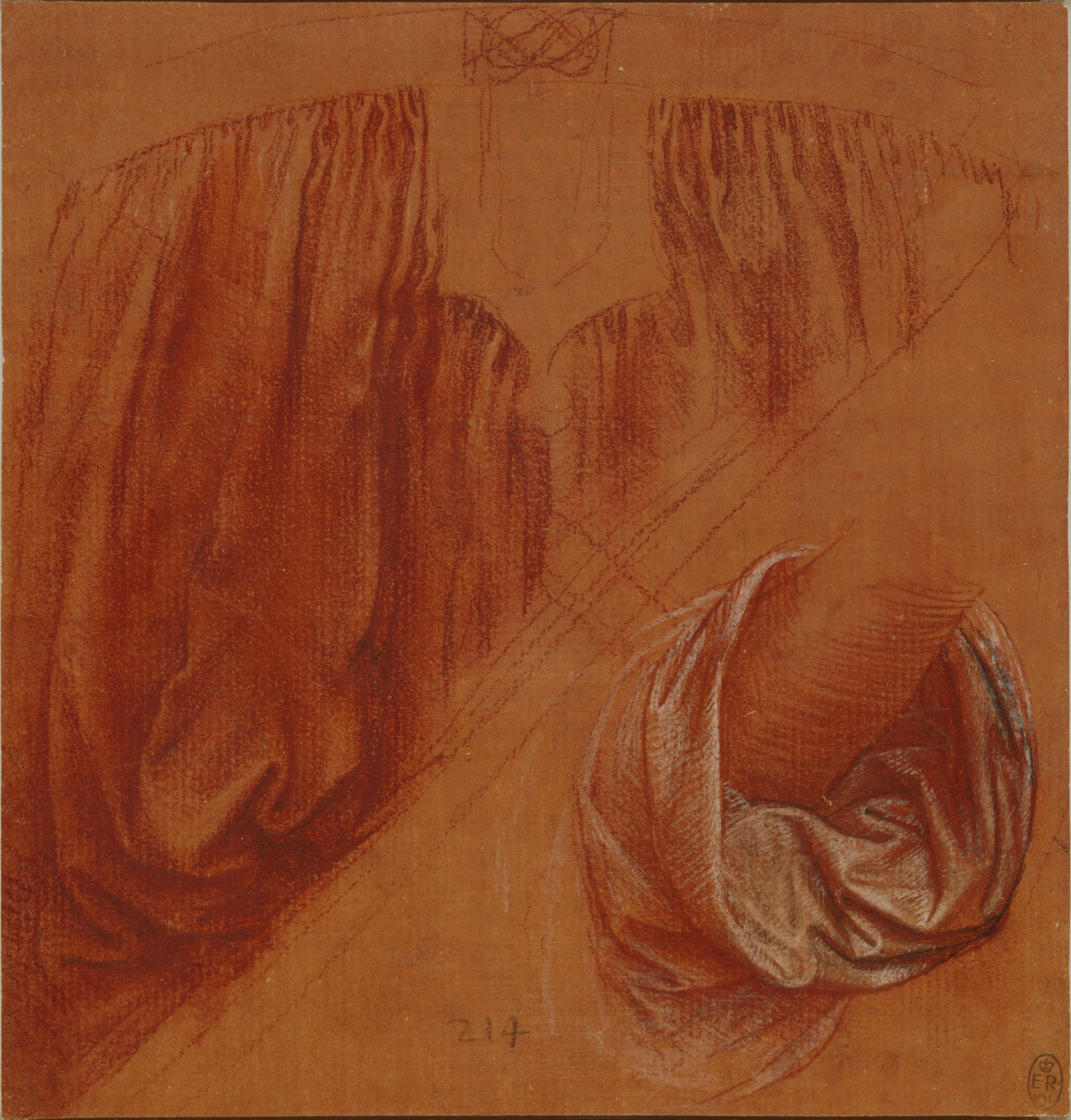
Two studies of drapery by Leonardo for Salvator Mundi, held by the Royal Collection

"There is extraordinary consensus it is by Leonardo," said the former co-chairman of old master paintings at Christie's, Nicholas Hall: "This is the most important old master painting to have been sold at auction in my lifetime." Christie's lists the ways scholars confirmed the attribution to Leonardo da Vinci:

The reasons for the unusually uniform scholarly consensus that the painting is an autograph work by Leonardo are several, including the previously mentioned relationship of the painting to the two autograph preparatory drawings in Windsor Castle; its correspondence to the composition of the 'Salvator Mundi' documented in Wenceslaus Hollar's etching of 1650; and its manifest superiority to the more than 20 known painted versions of the composition.

Furthermore, the extraordinary quality of the picture, especially evident in its best-preserved areas, and its close adherence in style to Leonardo's known paintings from circa 1500, solidifies this consensus.

According to Robert Simon, "Leonardo painted the Salvator Mundi with walnut oil rather than linseed oil, as all the other artists in that period did ... In fact, he wrote about using walnut oil, as it was a new advanced technique." Simon also states that ultraviolet imaging reveals that the darker areas of the painting are mostly owing to the restoration; the rest is original paint.

The art critic Ben Lewis, who disputes a full attribution to Leonardo, admits that his authorship of the work is possible, owing to the originality of the face, which has "something modern about it". Kemp says:

I don't rule out the possibility of studio participation ... But I cannot define any areas that I would say are studio work.

An examination of the painting had been conducted by the Centre for Research and Restoration of Museums of France (C2RMF) for the Louvre in June 2018. A publication was prepared by the Louvre and printed in 2019 in case the Louvre had the chance to present the painting in its exhibition, and was temporarily available in the Louvre bookshop. It contains essays by Vincent Delieuvin, the chief curator of paintings at the Louvre, and Myriam Eveno and Elisabeth Ravaud from the Louvre's laboratory C2RMF. In his preface, the museum's director Jean-Luc Martinez states that "The results of the historical and scientific study presented in this publication allow us to confirm the attribution of the work to Leonardo da Vinci, an appealing hypothesis which was initially presented in 2010 and which has sometimes been disputed". Delieuvin differentiated the picture from other studio versions – including the Ganay version that appeared in the Louvre's Leonardo exhibition – by the presence of subtle underpainting, numerous pentimenti, and pictorial quality. He concludes:

All these factors invite us to privilege the idea of a work that is entirely autograph, sadly damaged by the poor conservation of the work and by previous restorations which were too brutal.

In the discussion of the scientific evidence, Ravaud and Eveno write:

The examination of the Salvator Mundi seems to us to demonstrate that the painting was indeed executed by Leonardo. It is essential in this context to distinguish the original parts from those that have been changed or repainted and this is indeed what was carried out during this study notably by using X-ray fluorescence. Examination under a microscope revealed very skilful execution, notably in the skin colouring and in the curls of the hair, and great refinement notably in the depiction of the relief of the embroidery [knotwork].

Radiography showed the same very faint outlines as in the St. Anne, Mona Lisa and St. John the Baptist, characteristic of Leonardo's work after 1500. The number of changes made during the creation of the work also plead in favour of an autograph work. The first version of the central 'plastron' with a pointed form, is immediately comparable to the central part of the tunic in the Windsor drawing and to our knowledge is not seen anywhere else.

In addition, the movement of the thumb was also noted in St. John by Leonardo. After intensive studies of the other Leonardo works in the Louvre's collection it seems to us that a number of the techniques observed in the Salvator Mundi are typical of Leonardo—the originality of the preparation, the use of ground glass and the remarkable use of vermillion in the hair and shadows. These latest elements all plead in favour of a late work by Leonardo, after St. John the Baptist, and dating from the second Milan period.

=== Partial attribution ===
Some respected experts on Renaissance art question the full attribution of the painting to Leonardo. Jacques Franck, a Paris-based art historian and Leonardo specialist who has studied the Mona Lisa out of the frame multiple times, stated: "The composition doesn't come from Leonardo, he preferred twisted movement. It's a good studio work with a little Leonardo at best, and it's very damaged. It's been called 'the male Mona Lisa', but it doesn't look like it at all."

Michael Daley, the director of ArtWatch UK, doubts the Salvator Mundi's authenticity and theorizes that it may be the prototype of a subject painted by Leonardo: "This quest for an autograph prototype Leonardo painting might seem moot or vain: not only do the two drapery studies comprise the only accepted Leonardo material that might be associated with the group, but within the Leonardo literature there is no documentary record of the artist ever having been involved in such a painting project."

Carmen Bambach, a specialist in Italian Renaissance art at the Metropolitan Museum of Art, questioned full attribution to Leonardo: "having studied and followed the picture during its conservation treatment, and seeing it in the context in the National Gallery exhibition, much of the original painting surface may be by Boltraffio, but with passages done by Leonardo himself, namely Christ's proper right blessing hand, portions of the sleeve, his left hand and the crystal orb he holds." In 2019, Bambach criticized Christie's for its claim that she was one of the experts who had attributed the painting to Leonardo. In her 2019 book Leonardo da Vinci Rediscovered, she is even more specific, attributing most of the work to Boltraffio, "with only 'small retouchings' by the master himself".

Matthew Landrus, an art historian at the University of Oxford, agreed with the concept of parts of the painting being executed by Leonardo ("between 5 and 20%"), but attributes the painting to Leonardo's studio assistant Bernardino Luini, noting Luini's ability in painting gold tracery.

Frank Zöllner, the author of the catalogue raisonné Leonardo da Vinci. The Complete Paintings and Drawings, writes:

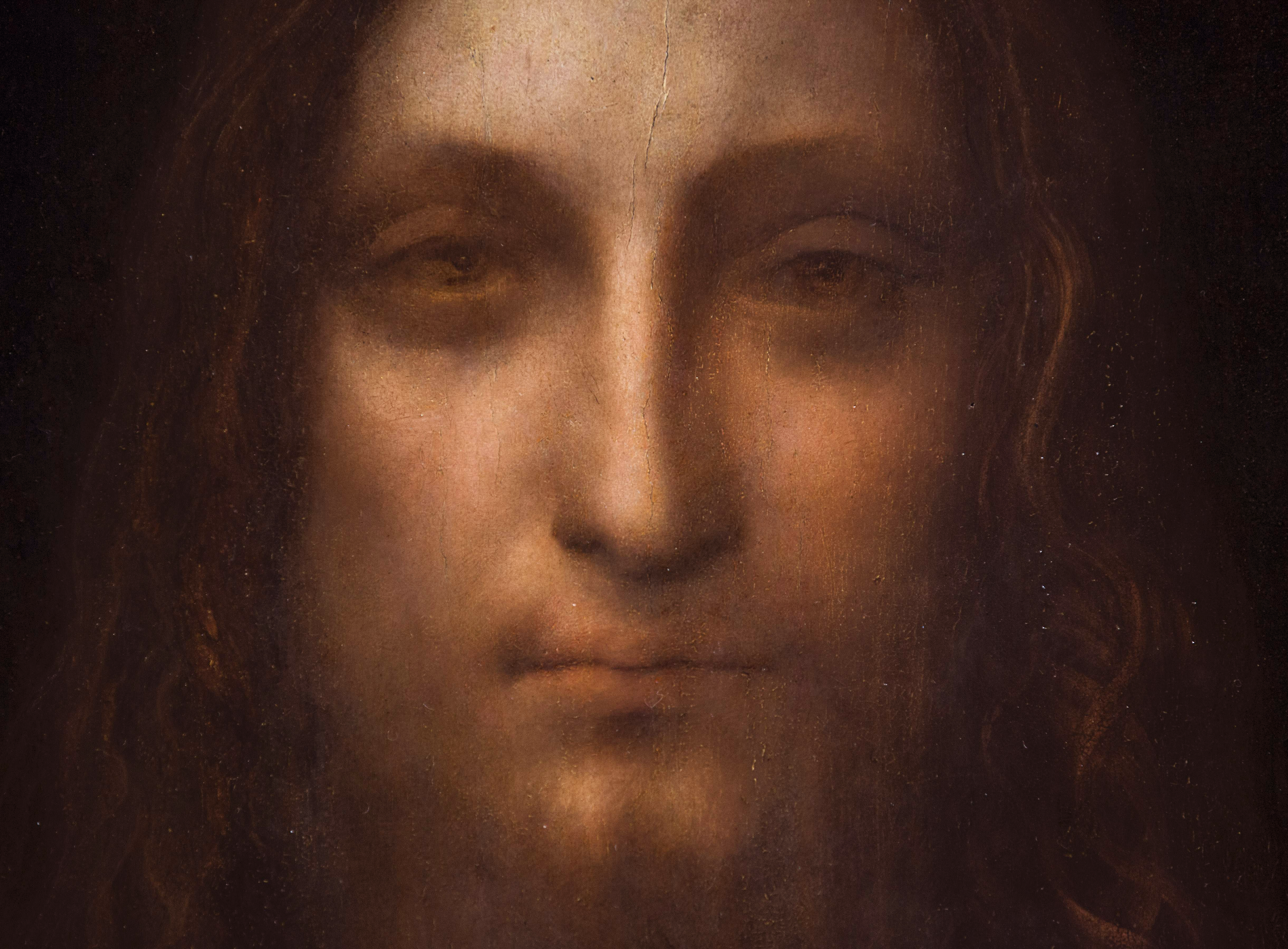
Over-cleaning resulted in abrasion over the entire painting, especially in the face and hair. Above Christ's left eye (right) are visible marks that the original artist made to soften the flesh with the heel of his hand.

This attribution is controversial primarily on two grounds. Firstly, the badly damaged painting had to undergo very extensive restoration, which makes its original quality extremely difficult to assess. Secondly, the Salvator Mundi in its present state exhibits a strongly developed sfumato technique that corresponds more closely to the manner of a talented Leonardo pupil active in the 1520s than to the style of the master himself. The way in which the painting was placed on the market also gave rise to concern.

Zöllner also explains that the quality of Salvator Mundi surpasses other known versions; however,

[It] also exhibits a number of weaknesses. The flesh tones of the blessing hand, for example, appear pallid and waxen as in a number of workshop paintings. Christ's ringlets also seem to me too schematic in their execution, the larger drapery folds too undifferentiated, especially on the right-hand side ... It will probably only be possible to arrive at a more informed verdict on this question after the results of the painting's technical analyses have been published in full.

In a subsequent interview for the 2021 documentary The Lost Leonardo, Zöllner said: "You have the old parts of the painting which are original—these are by pupils—and the new parts of the painting, which look like Leonardo, but they are by the restorer. In some part, it's a masterpiece by Dianne Modestini".

In November 2021, scholars at the Museo del Prado included the painting under "attributed works, workshop of authorized and supervised by Leonardo" in the catalogue for Leonardo and the Copy of the Mona Lisa. The Prado curator Ana Gonzales Monzo wrote in the catalogue that the Ganay-collection copy of the Salvador Mundi was likely the closest to Leonardo's original design, and that it was likely done by the same artist that painted the Prado copy of the Mona Lisa. The curator of the Louvre's 2019–20 Leonardo exhibition, Vincent Delieuvin, wrote in the Prado catalogue that the painting had "details of surprisingly poor quality", and that "It is to be hoped that a future permanent display of the work will allow it to be reanalyzed with greater objectivity".

=== Rejection of attribution ===
The British art historian Charles Hope dismissed the attribution to Leonardo entirely in a January 2020 analysis of the painting's quality and provenance. He doubted that Leonardo would have painted a work where the eyes were not level and the drapery undistorted by a crystal orb. He added, "The picture itself is a ruin, with the face much restored to make it reminiscent of the Mona Lisa." Hope condemned the National Gallery's involvement in Simon's "astute" marketing campaign.

In August 2020, Jacques Franck, who had previously called the portrait "a good studio work with a little Leonardo at best", cited its "childishly conceived left hand", as well as the "oddly long and thin nose, the simplified mouth [and] the over shadowy neck" as evidence that Leonardo did not paint it. More precisely, Franck now attributes the painting to Salaì jointly with Boltraffio: in effect, the work's infrared reflectogram betrays a very singular sketching-out technique, never seen in any of Leonardo's original paintings, yet encountered in Salaì's Head of Christ of 1511 in the Pinacoteca Ambrosiana, a composition close to the Saudi Salvator Mundi and signed by the artist. This claim is also supported by the fact that a stricto sensu Salvator Mundi painting is recorded in Salaì's posthumous inventory of the estate established in Milan on 25 April 1525.

In November 2020, a newly discovered drawing of Christ surfaced, possibly by Leonardo and with notable differences from the painting. According to the Leonardo scholar Annalisa Di Maria , "[This] is the true face of Salvator Mundi. [It] recalls everything in the drawings of Leonardo", pointing to the similar three-quarters view used in his presumed self-portrait. She continued, "[Leonardo] could never have portrayed such a frontal and motionless character." Kemp indicated that before he could review the drawing, he "would need to see if it is drawn left-handed".

== Reception ==
The rediscovered painting by Leonardo generated considerable interest within the media and general public amid its pre-auction viewings in Hong Kong, London, San Francisco and New York, as well as after the sale. More than 27,000 people saw the work in person before the auction: the highest number of pre-sale viewers for an individual work of art, according to Christie's. The sale was the first time Christie's had used an outside agency to advertise an artwork. Approximately 4,500 people stood in line to preview the work in New York the weekend prior to the sale. The sensationalism of the painting following the sale led to it being a common subject in popular culture and discourse online. As Brian Boucher described, "the internet went a little bonkers" in response to the sale, leading to sarcastic and humorous comments and memes on Twitter, Instagram and other social media sites. Similarly, Stephanie Eckardt noted how "the ongoing saga of Salvator Mundi indisputably" belongs in "the meme canon." In an article in the Art Market Monitor, Marion Maneker compared the sensationalism around Salvator Mundi to the media coverage surrounding the theft of the Mona Lisa from the Louvre in 1911. Just as the international media sensationalism lifted the painting to a high international status, she argued, so too did Christie's marketing campaign and media sensationalism lead to its high sales price. Alexandra Kim of the Harvard Crimson similarly described the reason for the painting's newfound fame:

Why are we still so adamantly curious [about Salvator Mundi]? The New York Times, The Guardian, and more have covered this painting and its aftermath. It now seems that the drama surrounding this infamous painting has created a whole new work of art larger than the Salvator Mundi itself. The attention has grossly inflated its value: the more we discuss the work, the more curious we are until it becomes a shining ball of artistic enlightenment.

The narratives surrounding the painting have piqued the interest of filmmakers and playwrights. In July 2020, the company Caiola Productions announced that it was working on the production of a Broadway musical based on the history of Leonardo's Salvator Mundi. (Note: When the project was announced, writer and dramatist Deborah Grace Winer was writing the book and the musical was planned to open in 2022.) In April 2021, Antoine Vitkine directed a feature-length documentary entitled The Savior for Sale, focusing on the painting and its exclusion from the 2019–2020 Leonardo exhibition at the Louvre. Shortly afterward, in June 2021, Andreas Koefoed's documentary The Lost Leonardo premiered at the Tribeca Film Festival, exploring how the painting became the most expensive ever sold and the trail of buyers involved, the debate around its attribution and provenance, and its failure to appear at the 2019–2020 Louvre exhibition.

== Gallery ==
=== Copies and variations ===
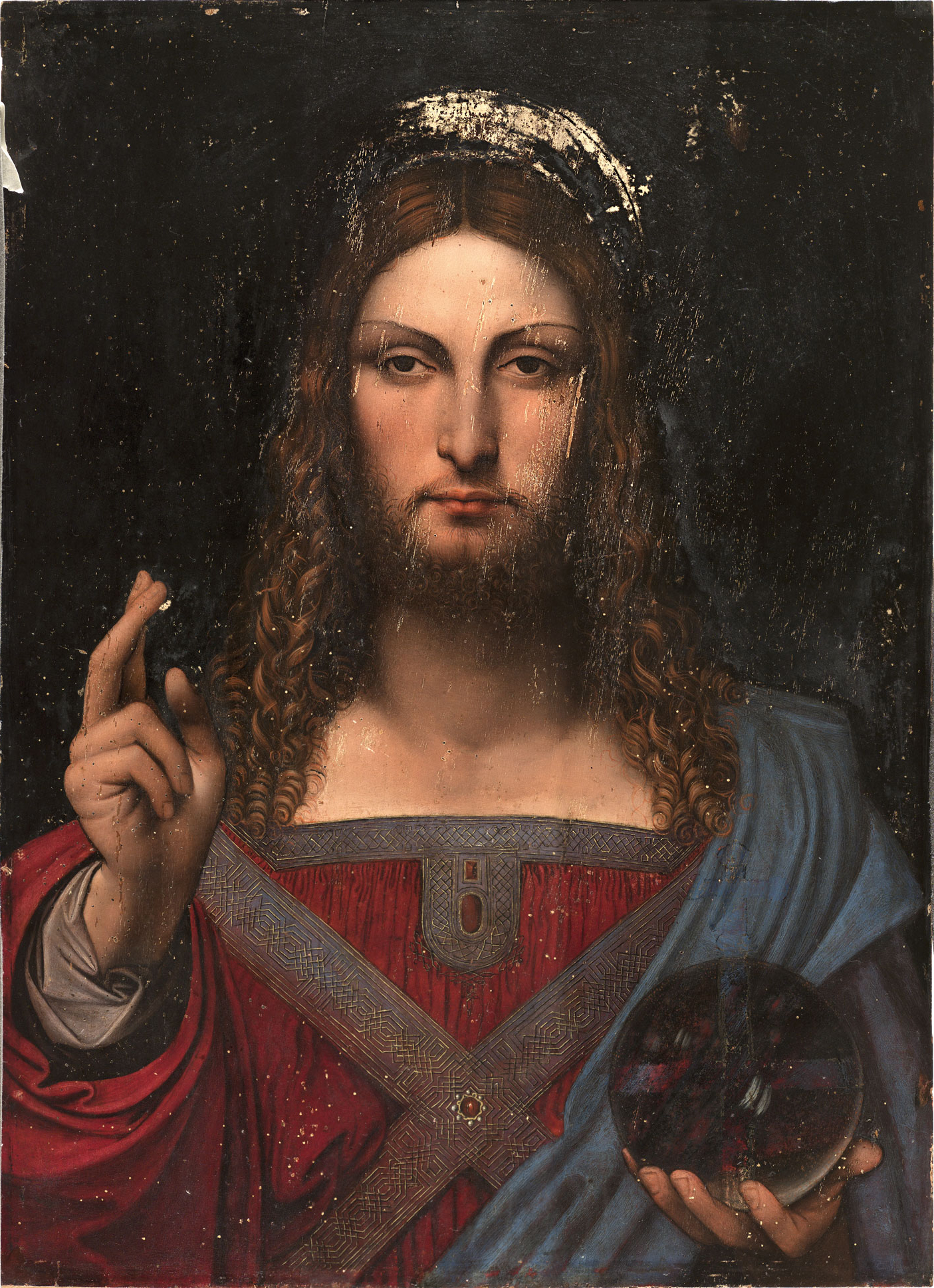
School of Leonardo da Vinci, Salvator Mundi (c. 1503), private collection (formerly Marquis Jean-Louis de Ganay Collection).

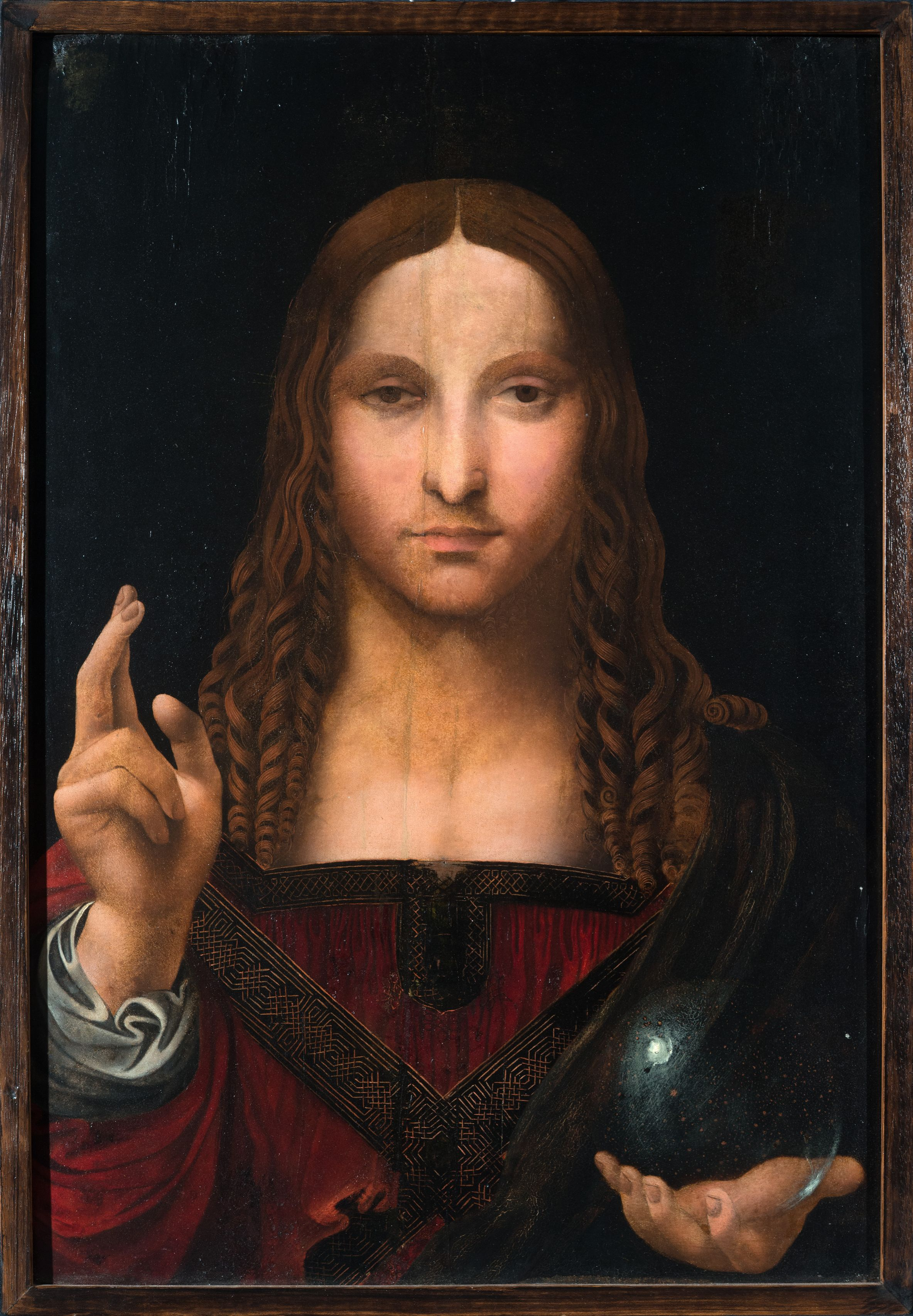
Follower of Leonardo da Vinci, Salvator Mundi (1508–1513), Museum of San Domenico Maggiore, Naples.

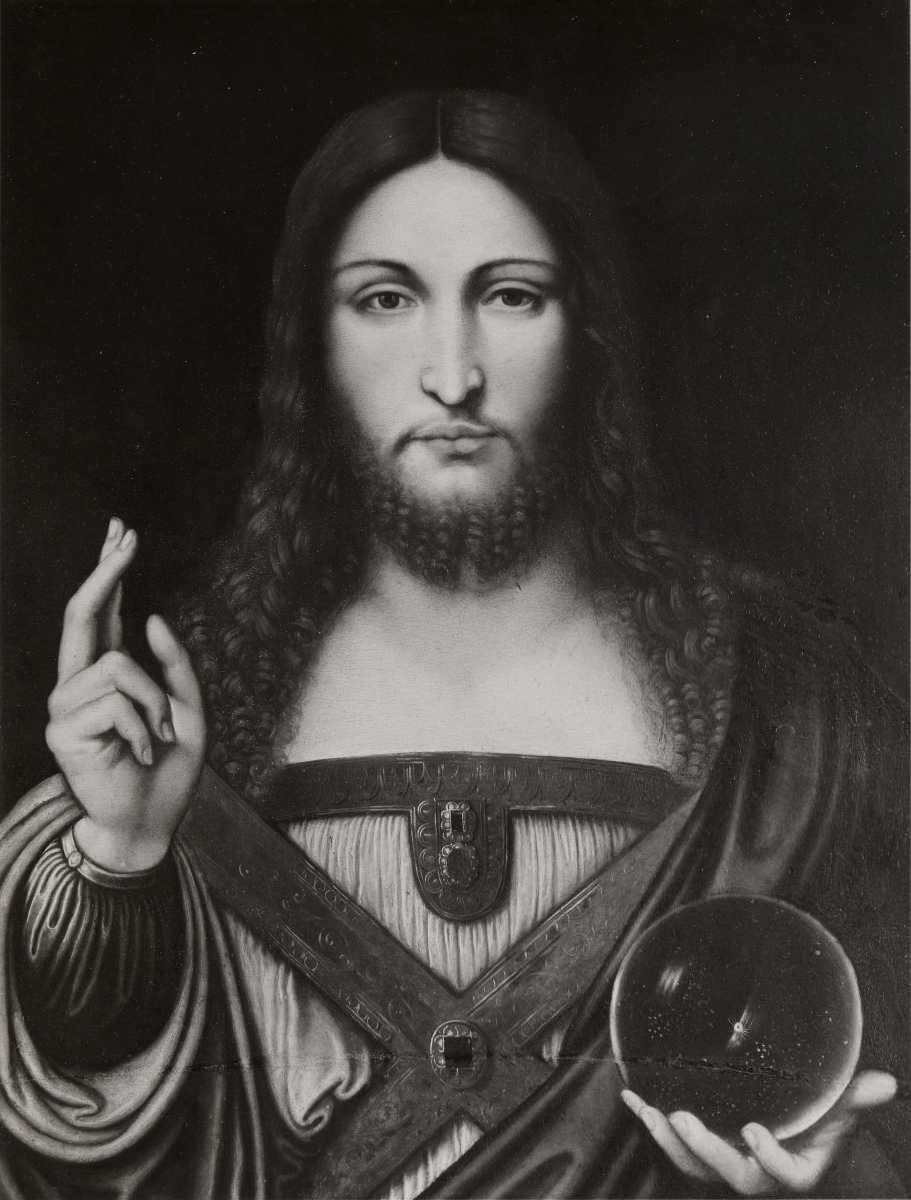
Follower of Leonardo da Vinci, Salvator Mundi (Cristo Redentore benedicente; early 16th century), Worsley Collection.

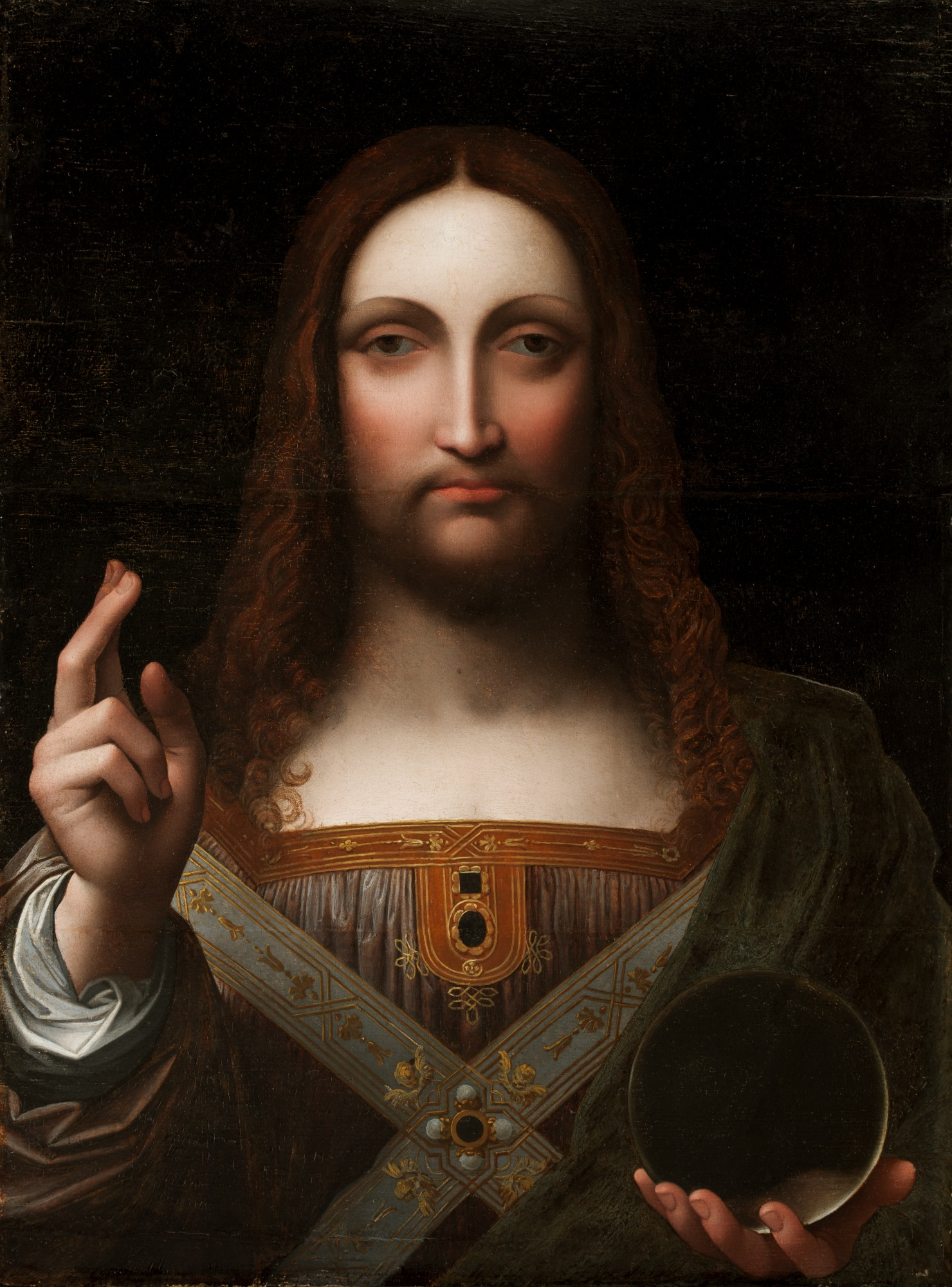
Giampietrino, Salvator Mundi (16th century), Detroit Institute of Arts.

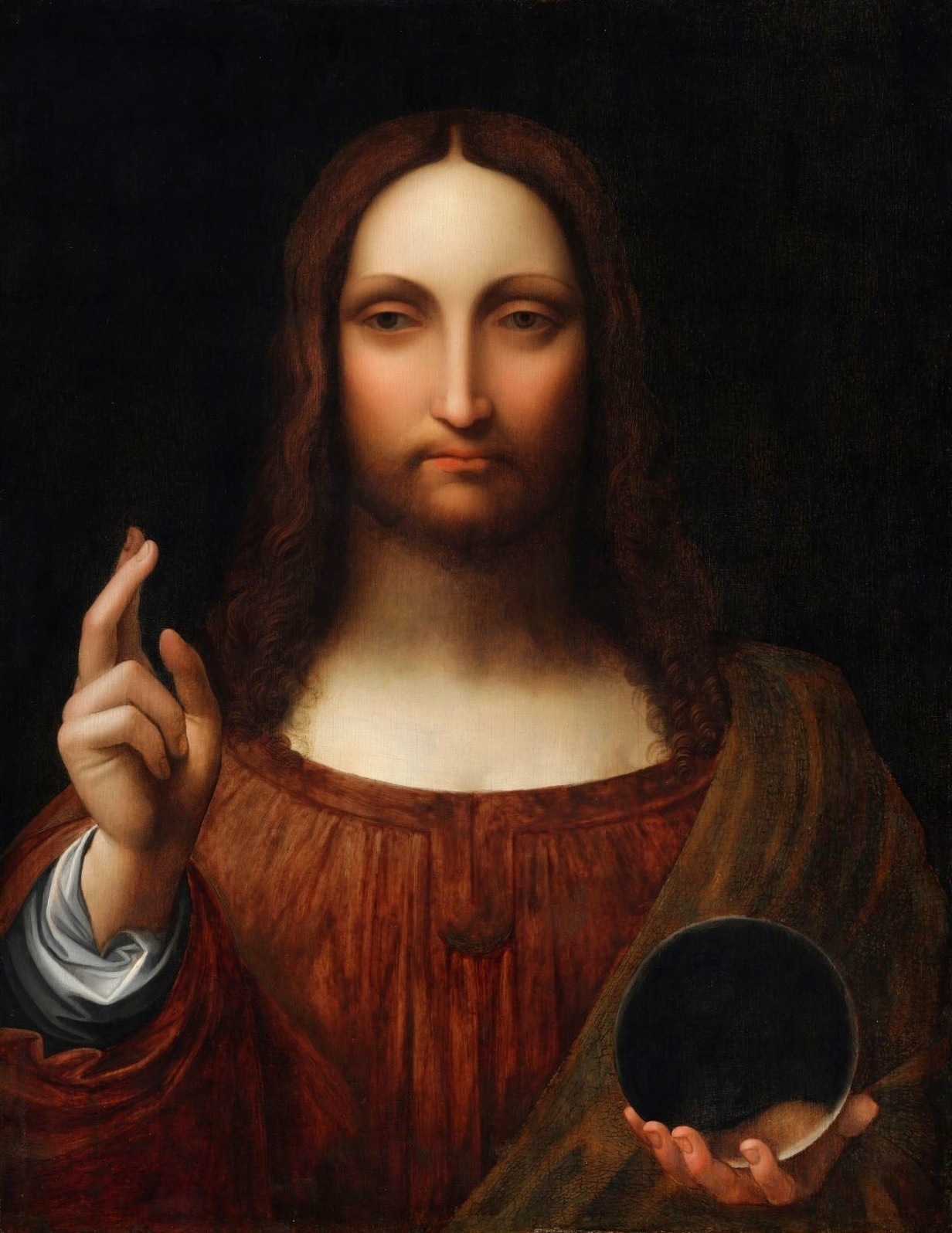
Cesare da Sesto, Salvator Mundi (1516–1517), Wilanów Palace, Warsaw

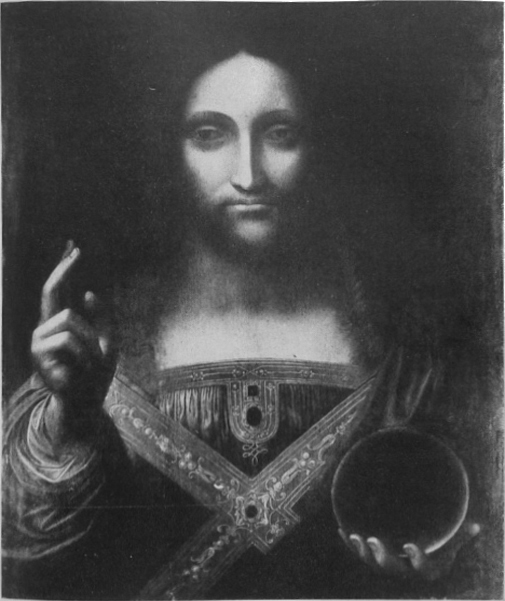
Follower of Leonardo da Vinci, Salvator Mundi (16th century), Sammlung Stark, Zürich.

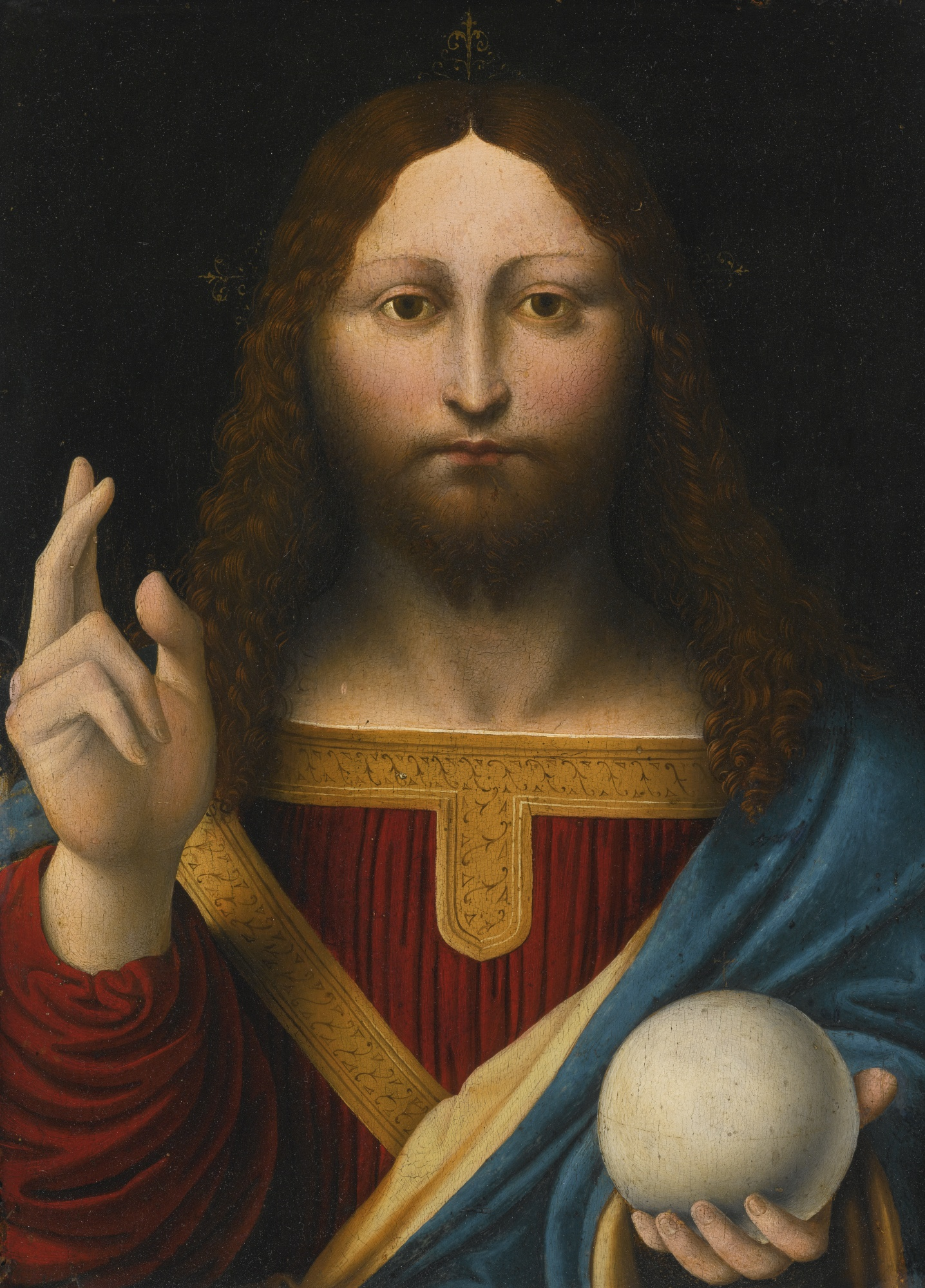
Lombard follower of Leonardo da Vinci (possibly Marco d'Oggiono), Salvator Mundi (16th century), private collection, formerly the Art Gallery of Ontario.

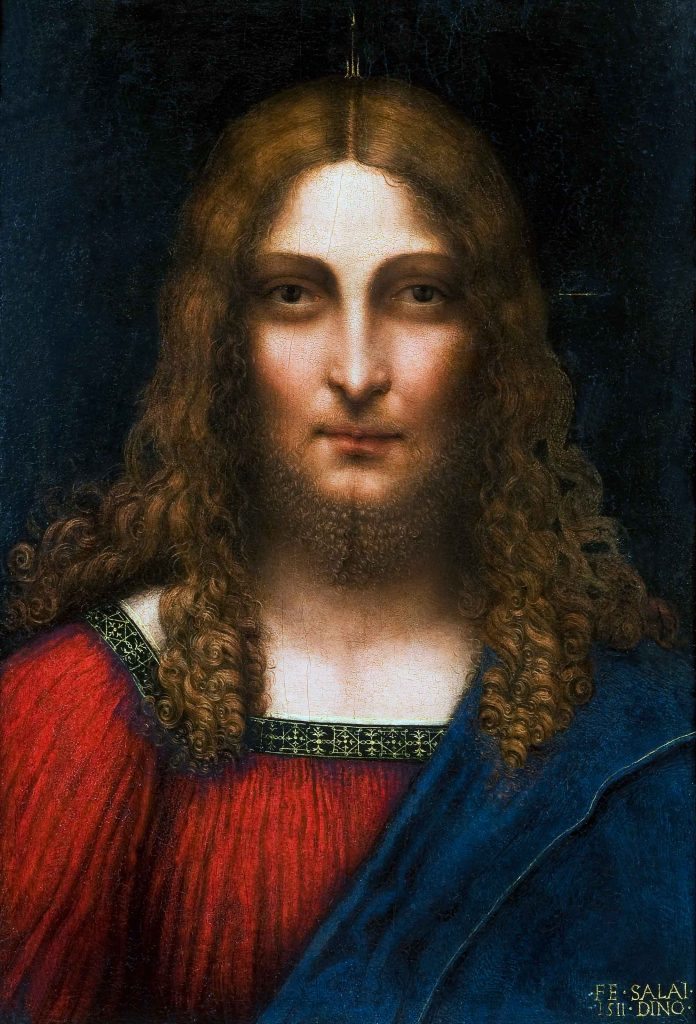
Salaì, Head of Christ the Redeemer (1511), Pinacoteca Ambrosiana, Milan.

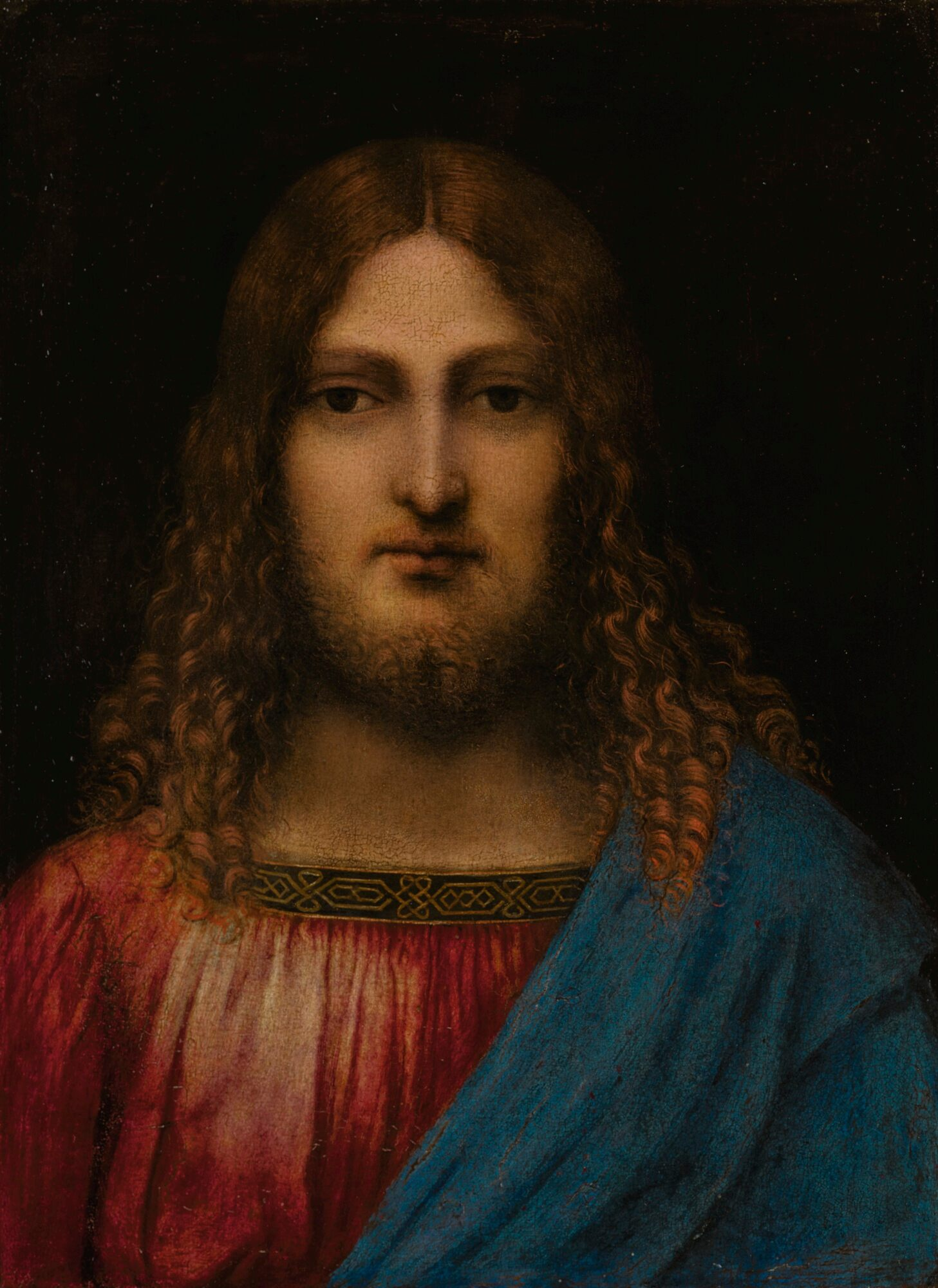
Milanese follower of Leonardo da Vinci, Bust of Christ (c. 1511–1513) private collection (Sotheby's Old Masters Evening Sale 5 December 2018). (Note: According to the lot essay accompanying the sale at Sotheby's, Cristina Geddo attributes this painting to a Milanese follower of Leonardo.)

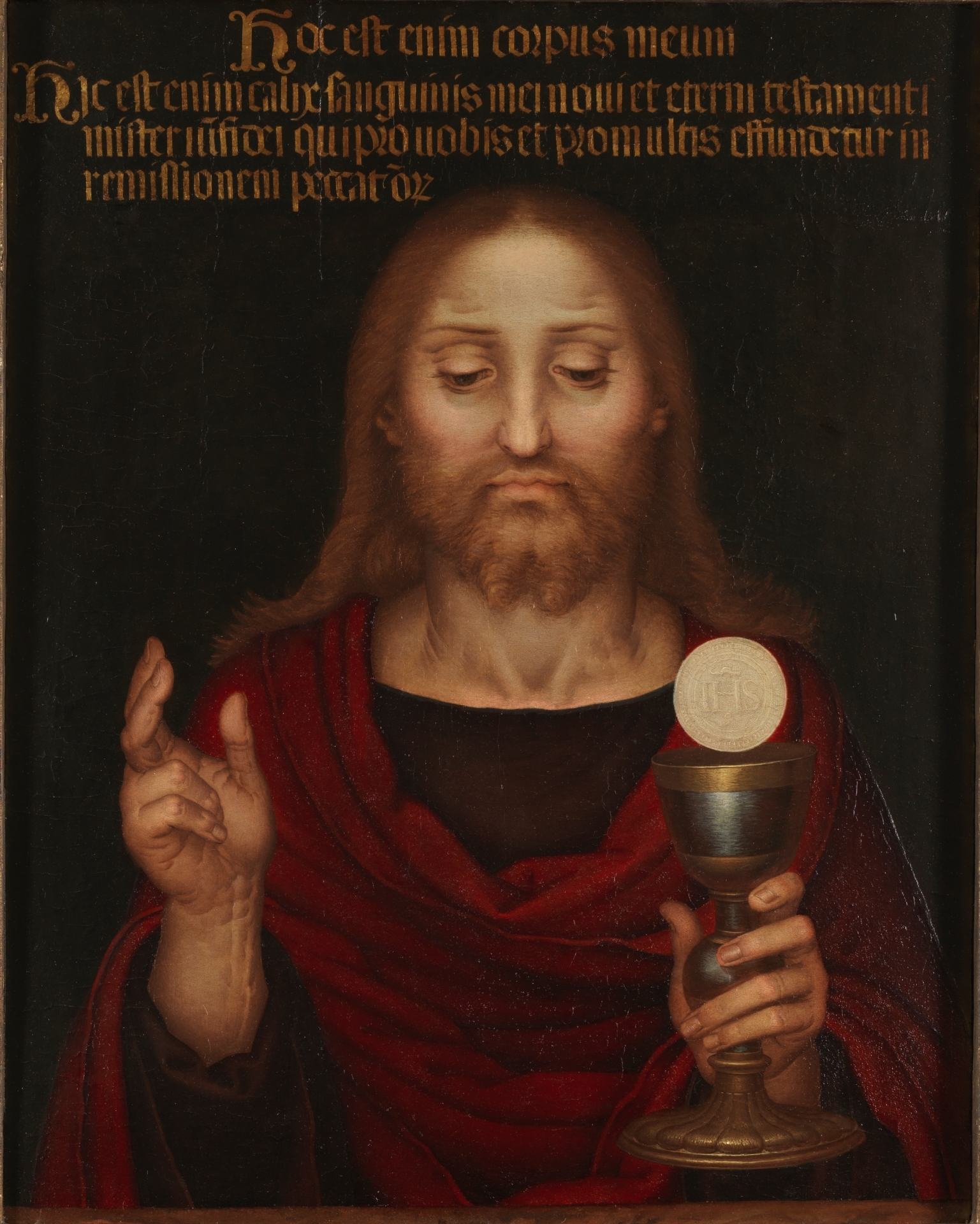
Fernando Yáñez de la Almedina, The Eucharistic Christ (c. 1525), Museo del Prado, Madrid.

=== Youthful Christ with a globe ===
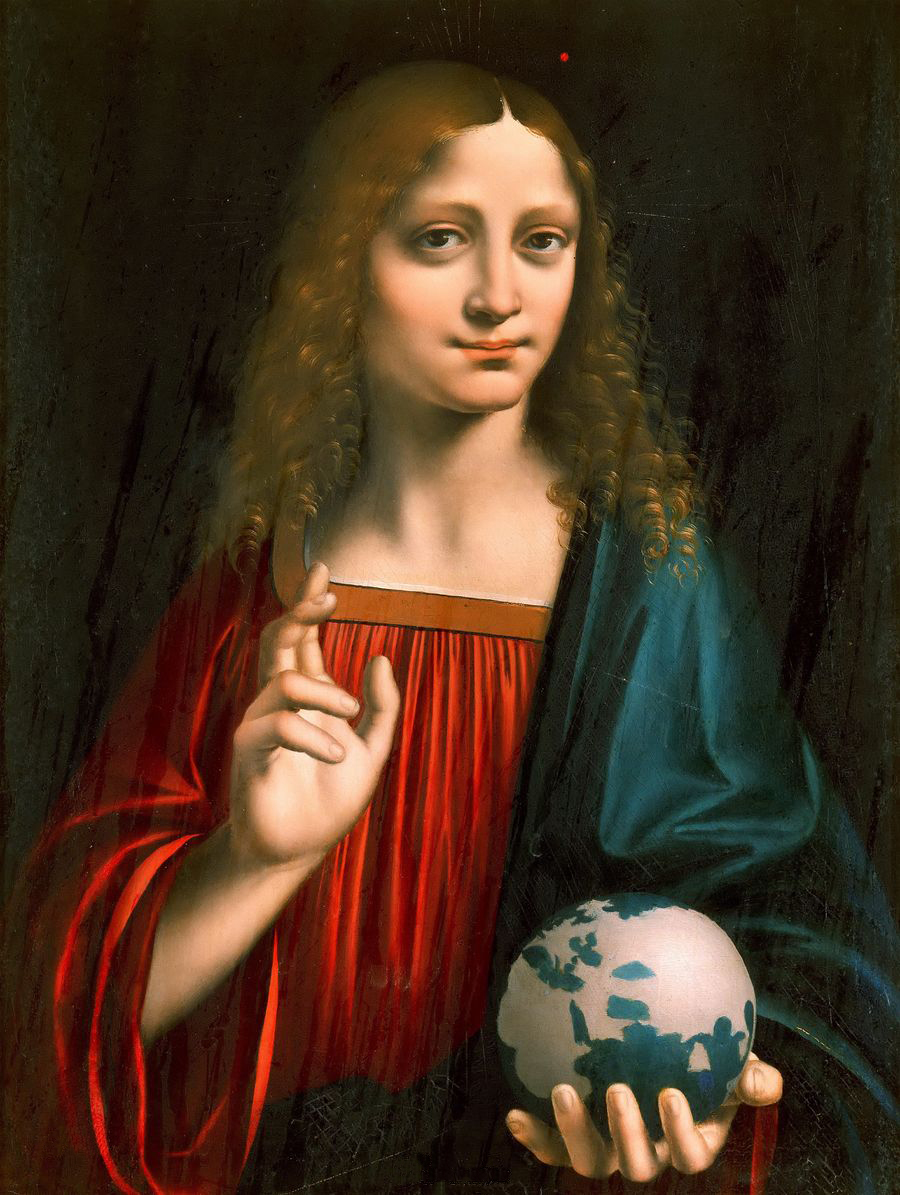
Marco d'Oggiono, Salvator Mundi (c. 1500), Galleria Borghese, Rome.

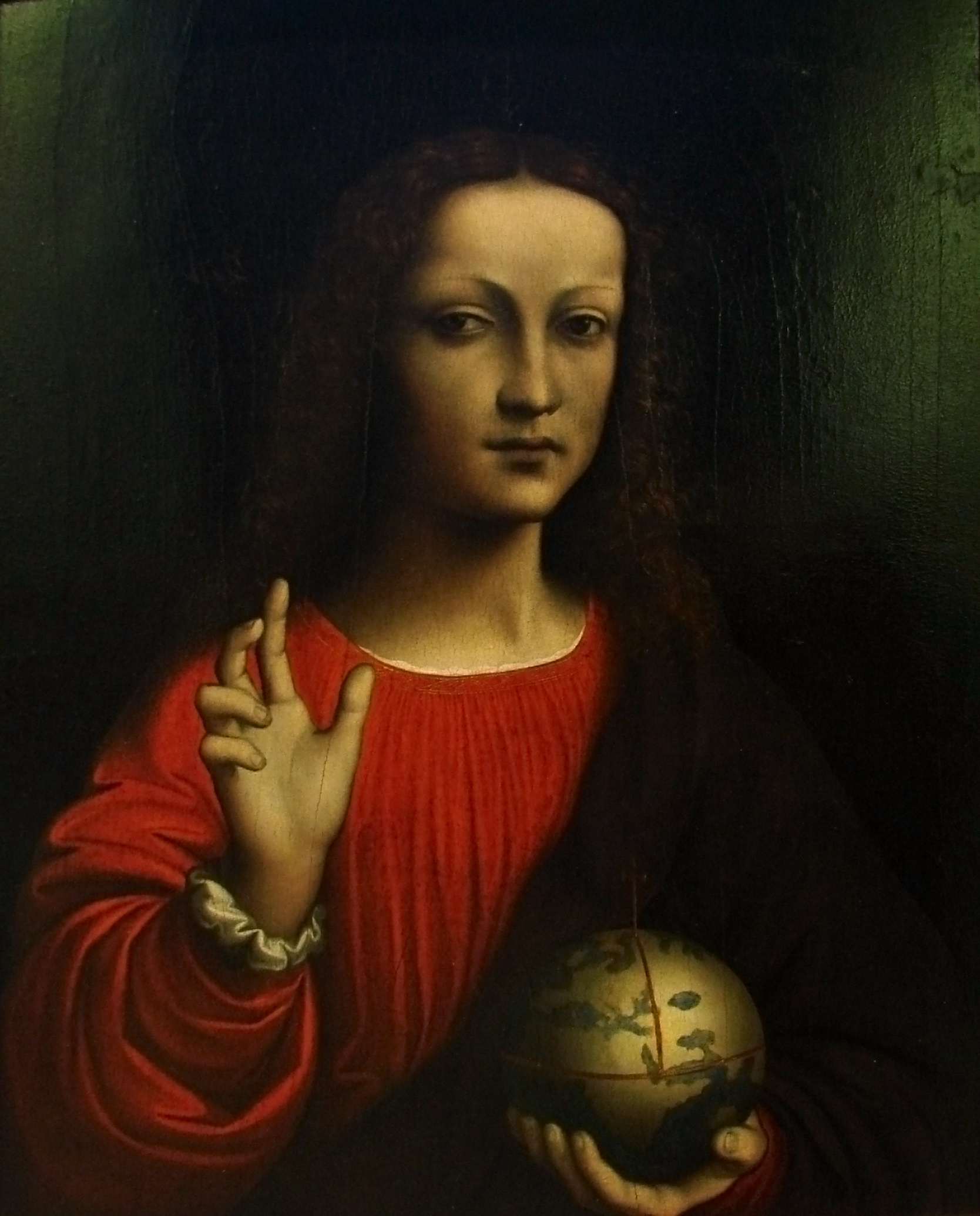
School of Leonardo da Vinci, Le Sauveur du monde (c. 1505), Musée des Beaux-Arts de Nancy.

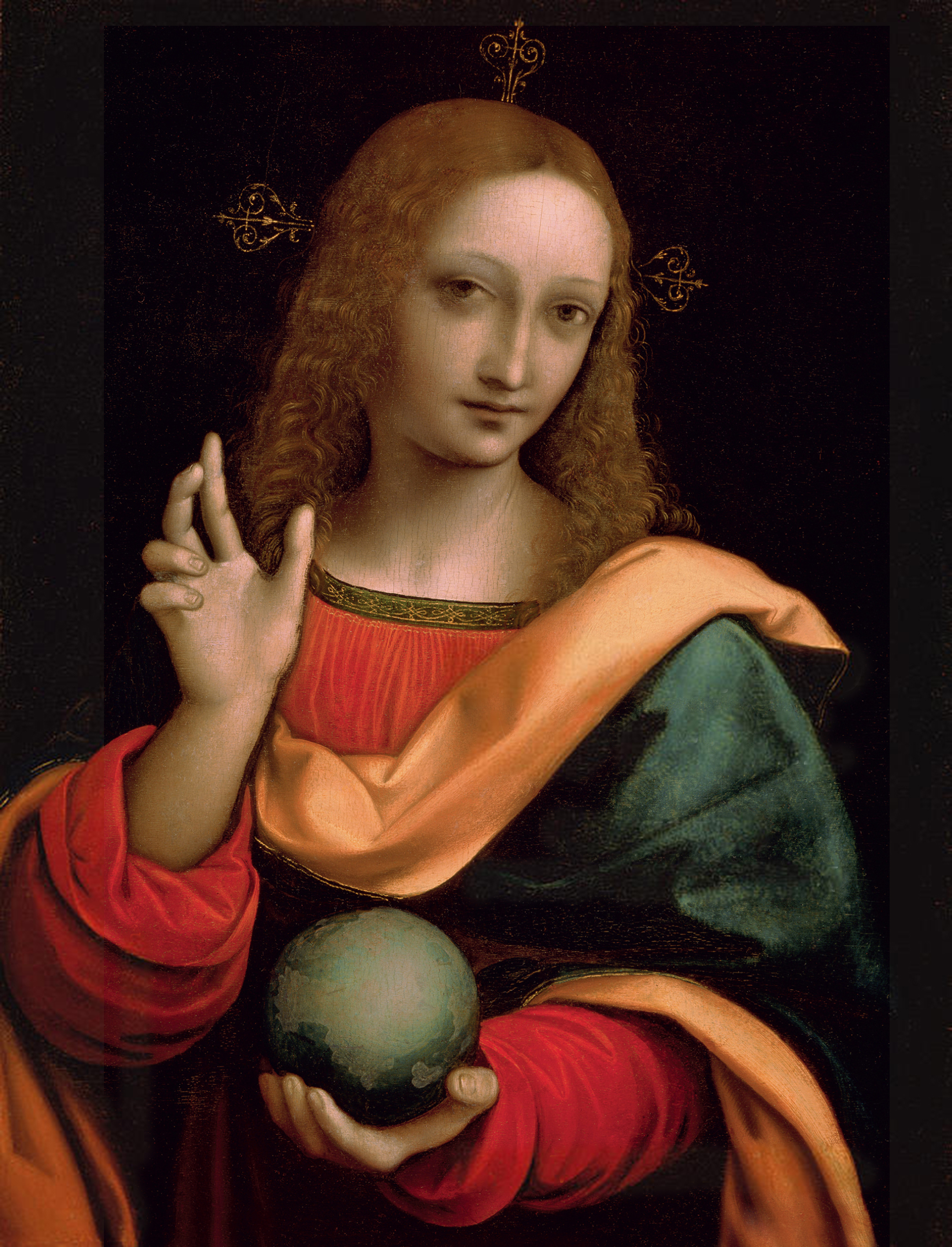
Giampietrino, Salvator Mundi, (early 16th century), Pushkin Museum, Moscow.

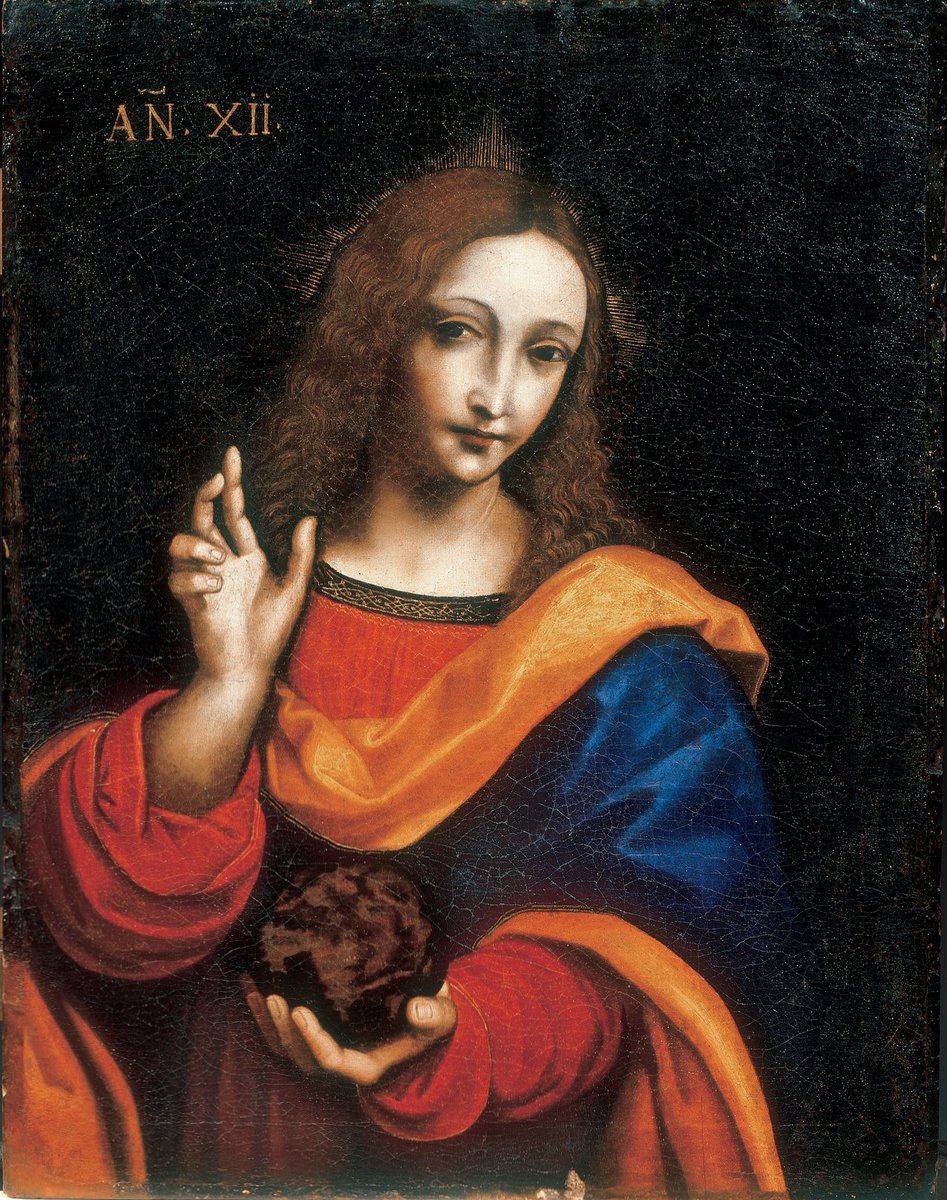
Follower of Leonardo da Vinci, Cristo giovanetto come Salvator Mundi, Museo Ideale Leonardo da Vinci.

=== Comparable examples ===
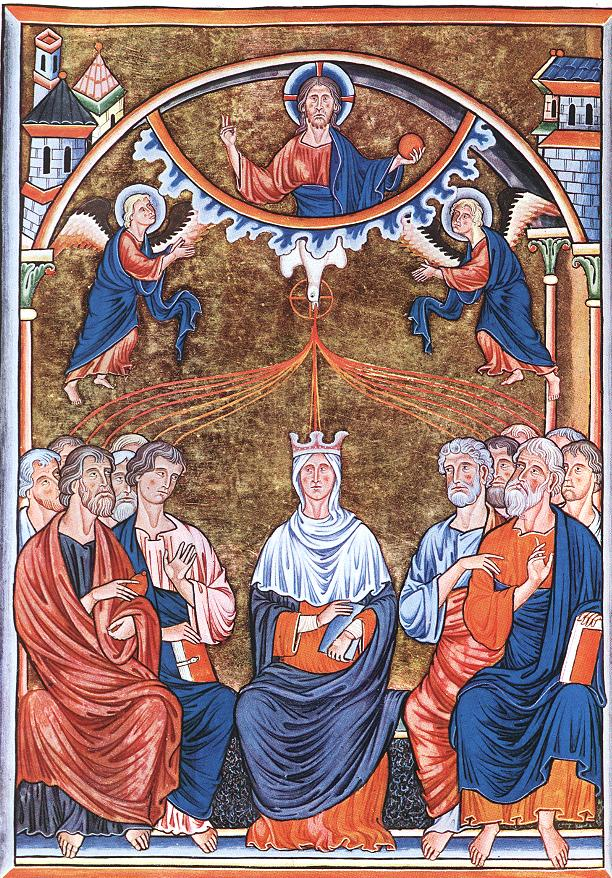
Unknown French miniaturist, Pentecost from the Ingeborg Psalter (c. 1195), Musée Condé, Chantilly. (Ms. 9 fol. 32v.)

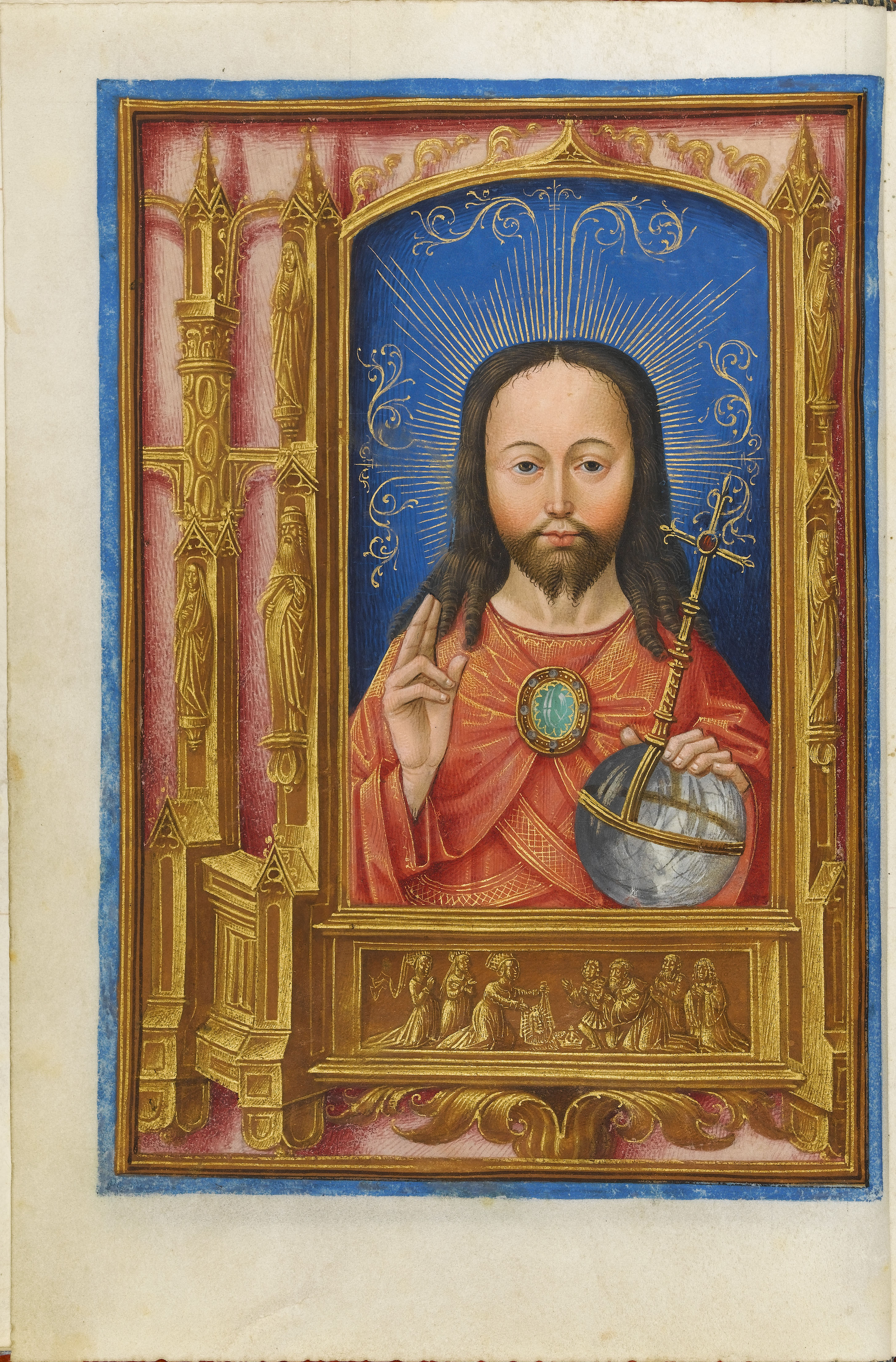
Unknown artist, miniature from a Flemish book of hours (Bruges), Salve Sancta Facies, Christ as Salvator Mundi (c. 1510) Fitzwilliam Museum, Cambridge (Ms 15677, fol. 13v).

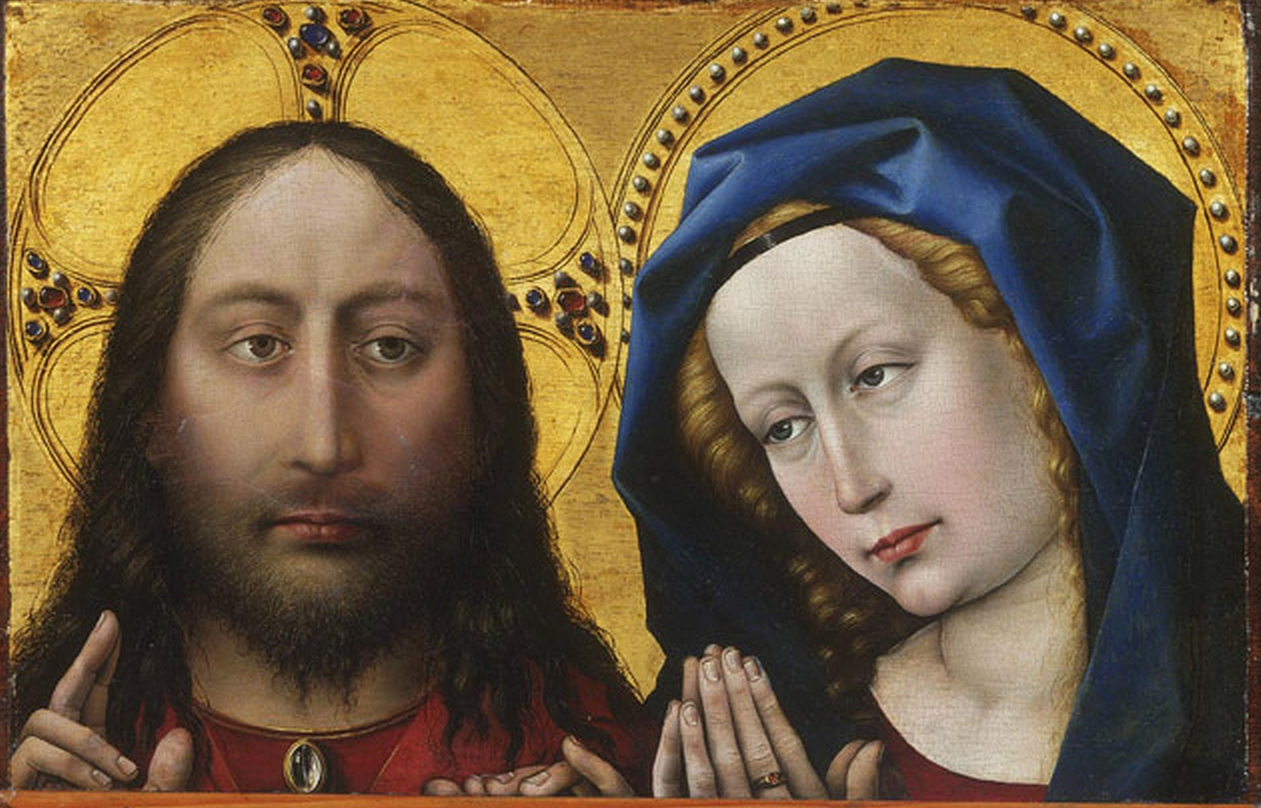
Robert Campin, Blessing Christ and Praying Virgin Mary (c. 1425), Philadelphia Museum of Art.

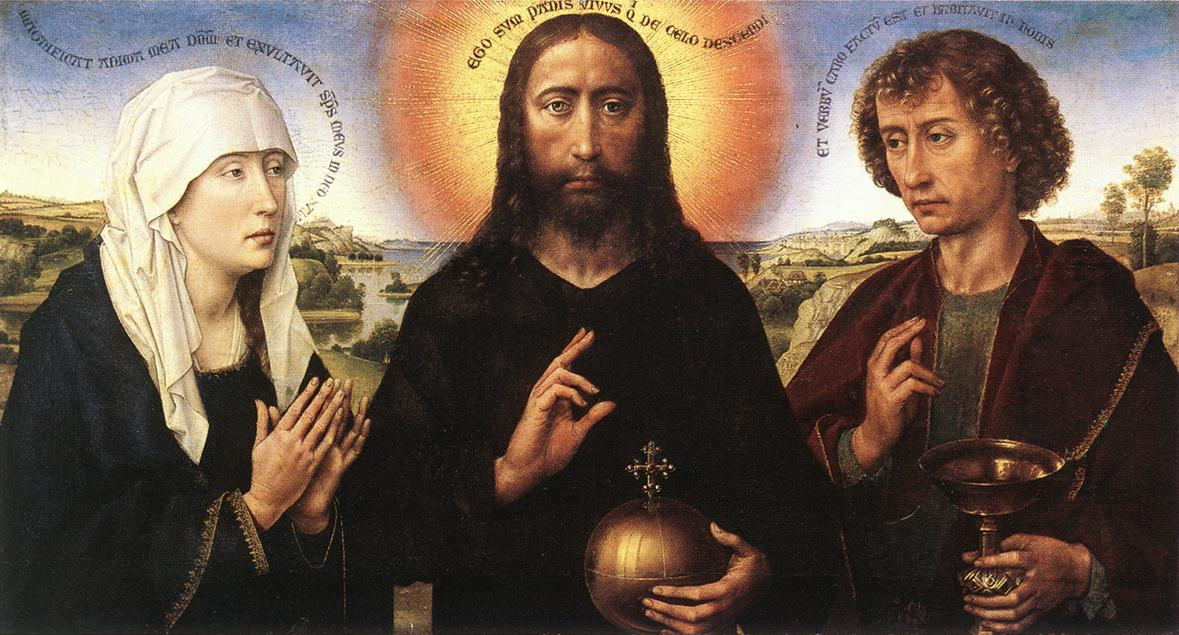
Rogier van der Weyden, Braque Triptych (central panel; c. 1452) Musée du Louvre, Paris.

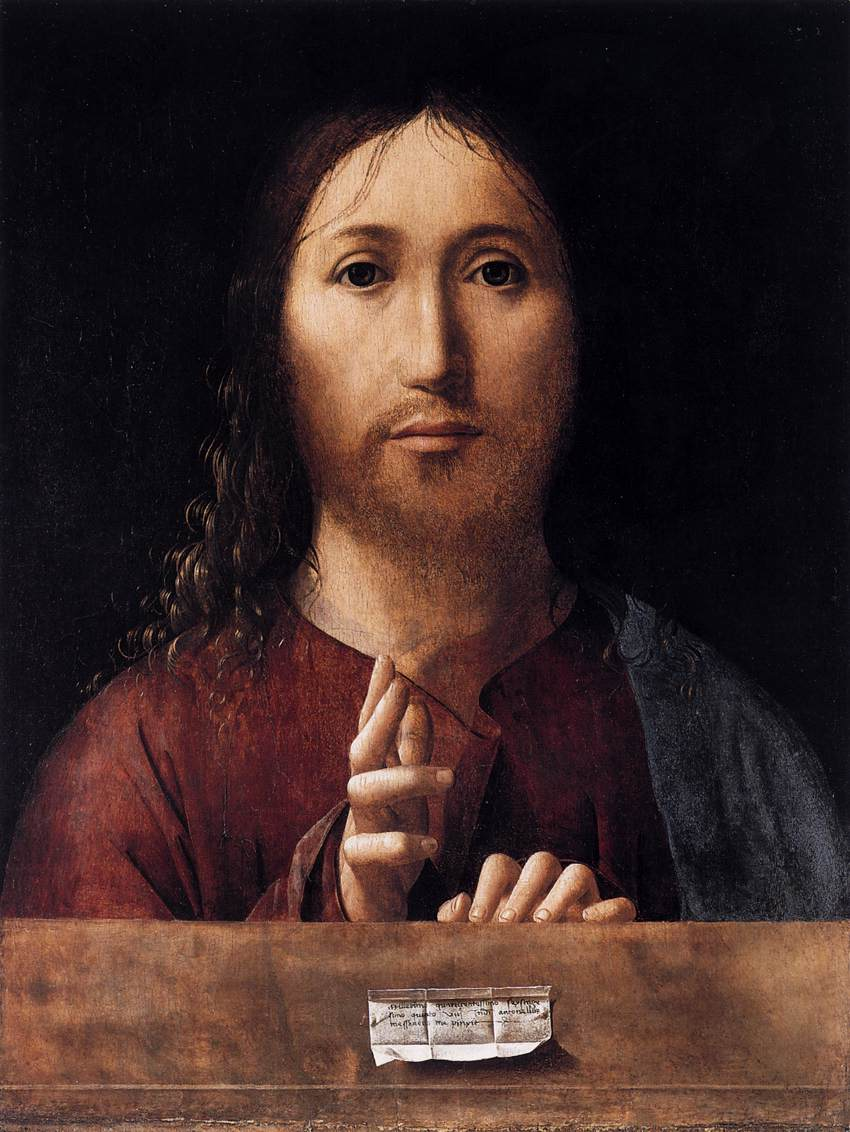
Antonello da Messina, Christ Blessing (1465), National Gallery, London.

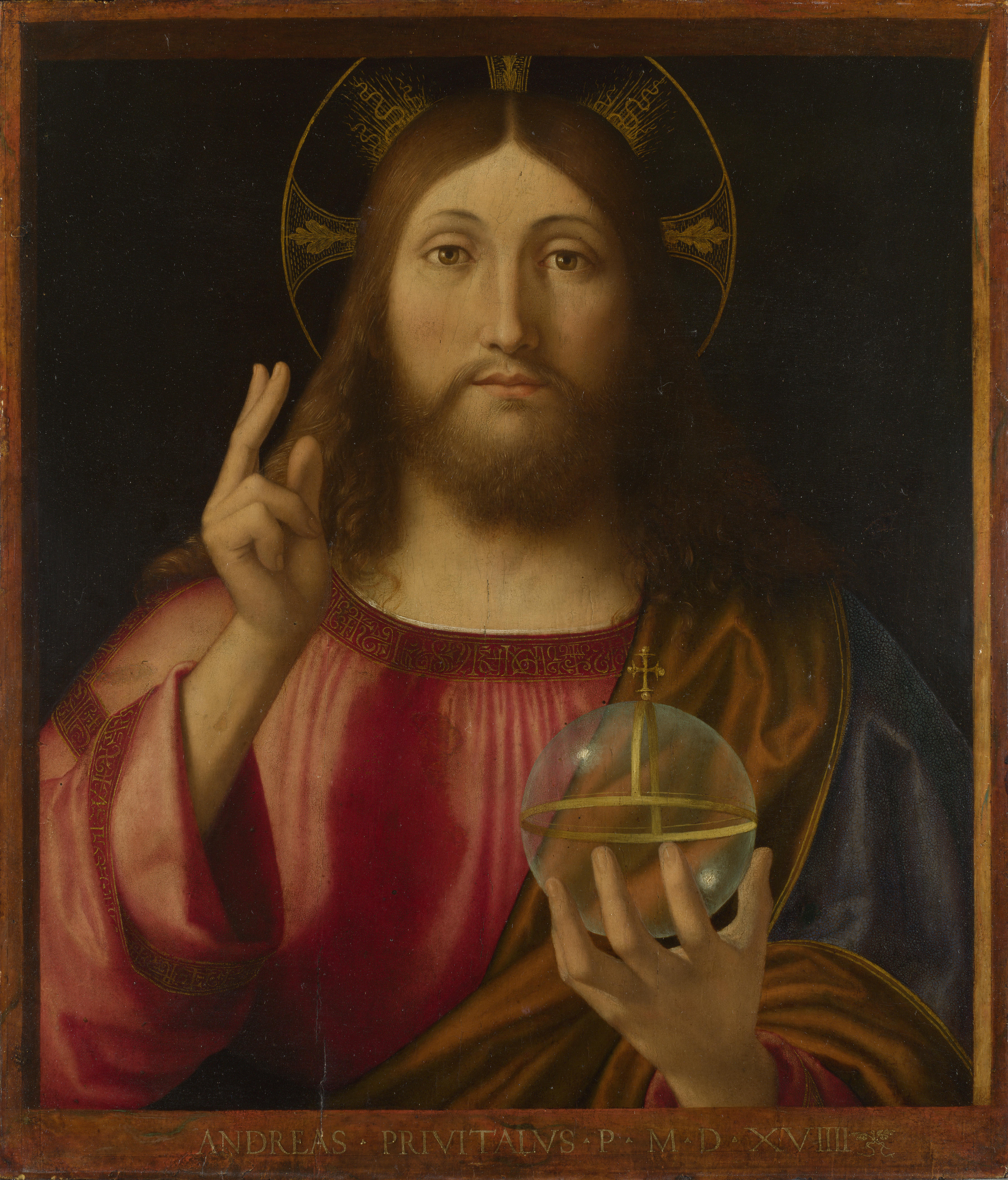
Andrea Previtali, Salvator Mundi (1519), National Gallery, London.

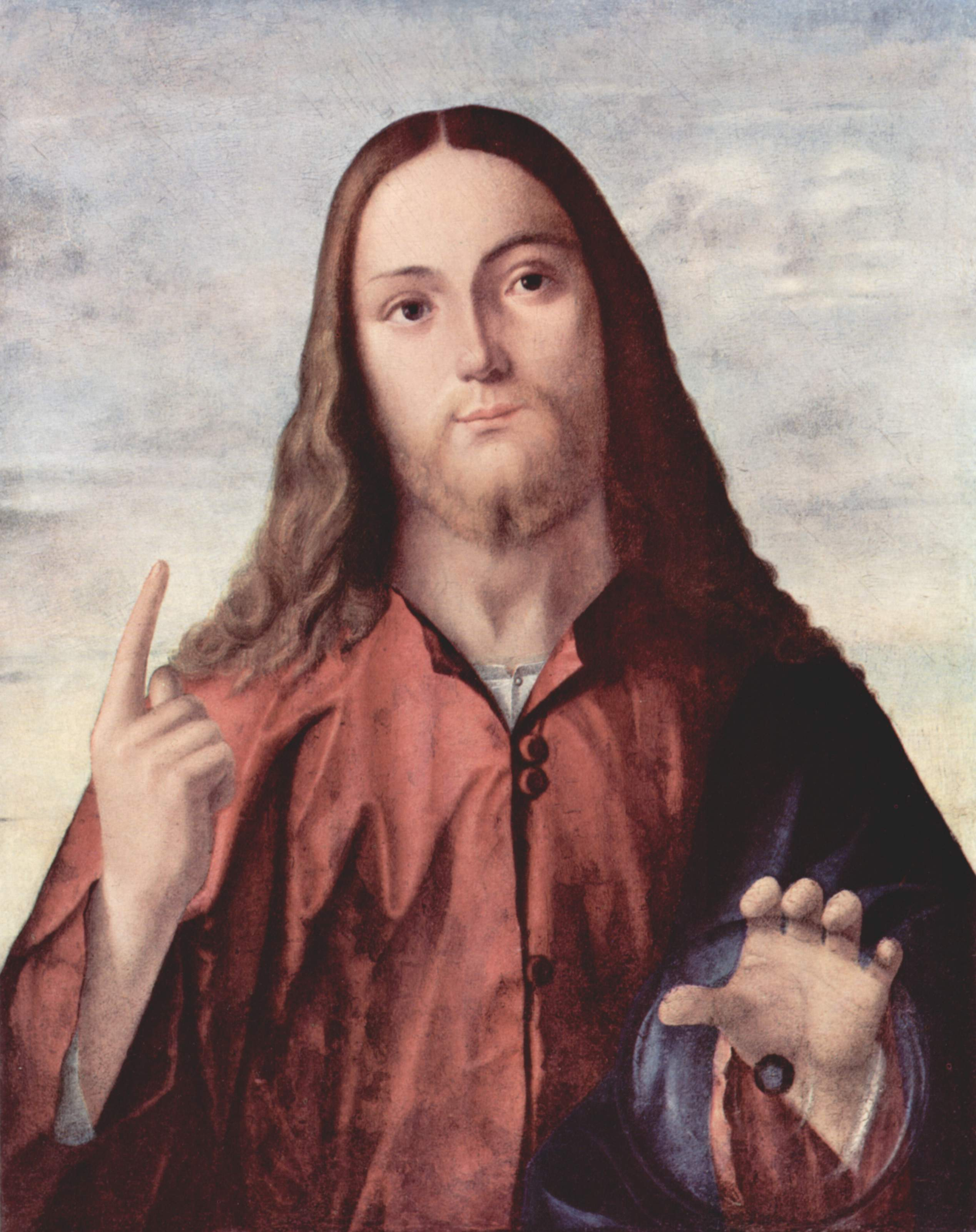
Vittore Carpaccio, Salvator Mundi (c. 1510), Isaac Delgado Museum of Art, New Orleans.

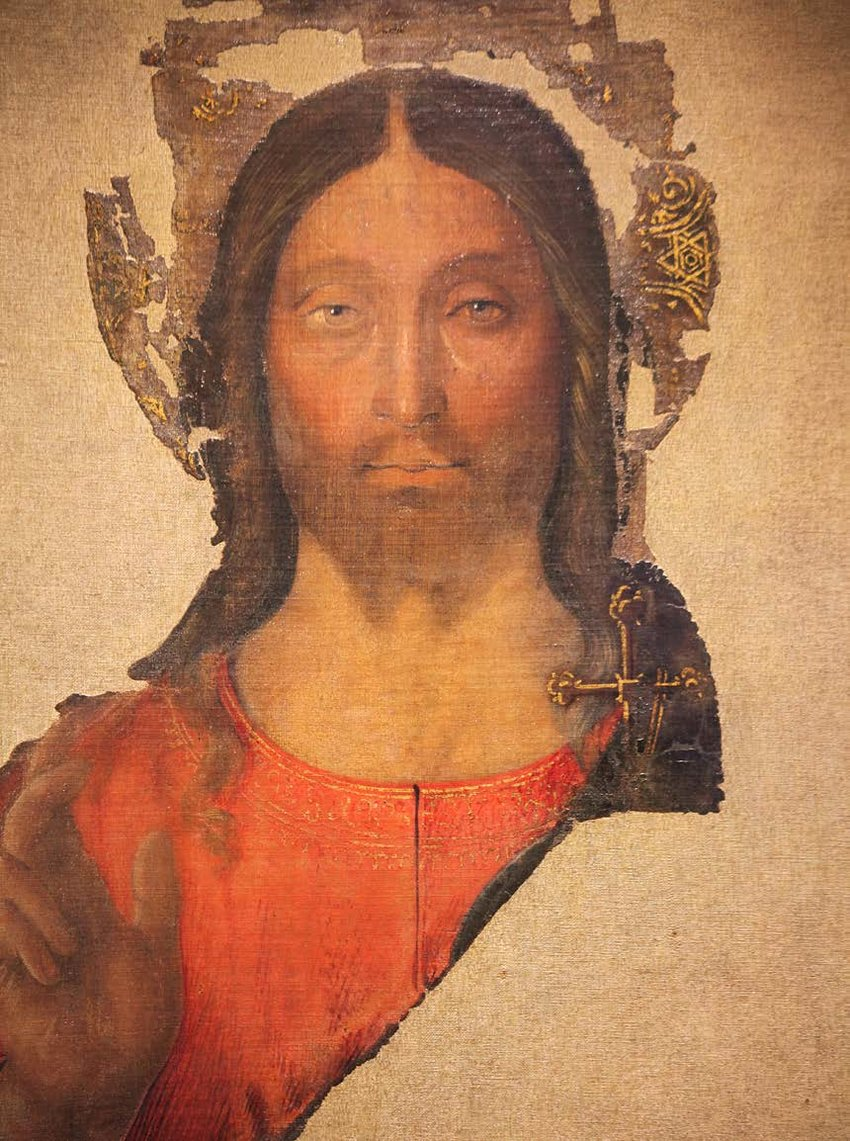
Melozzo da Forlì, Salvator Mundi (c. 1480–1482), Galleria Nazionale delle Marche, Palazzo Ducale, Urbino.

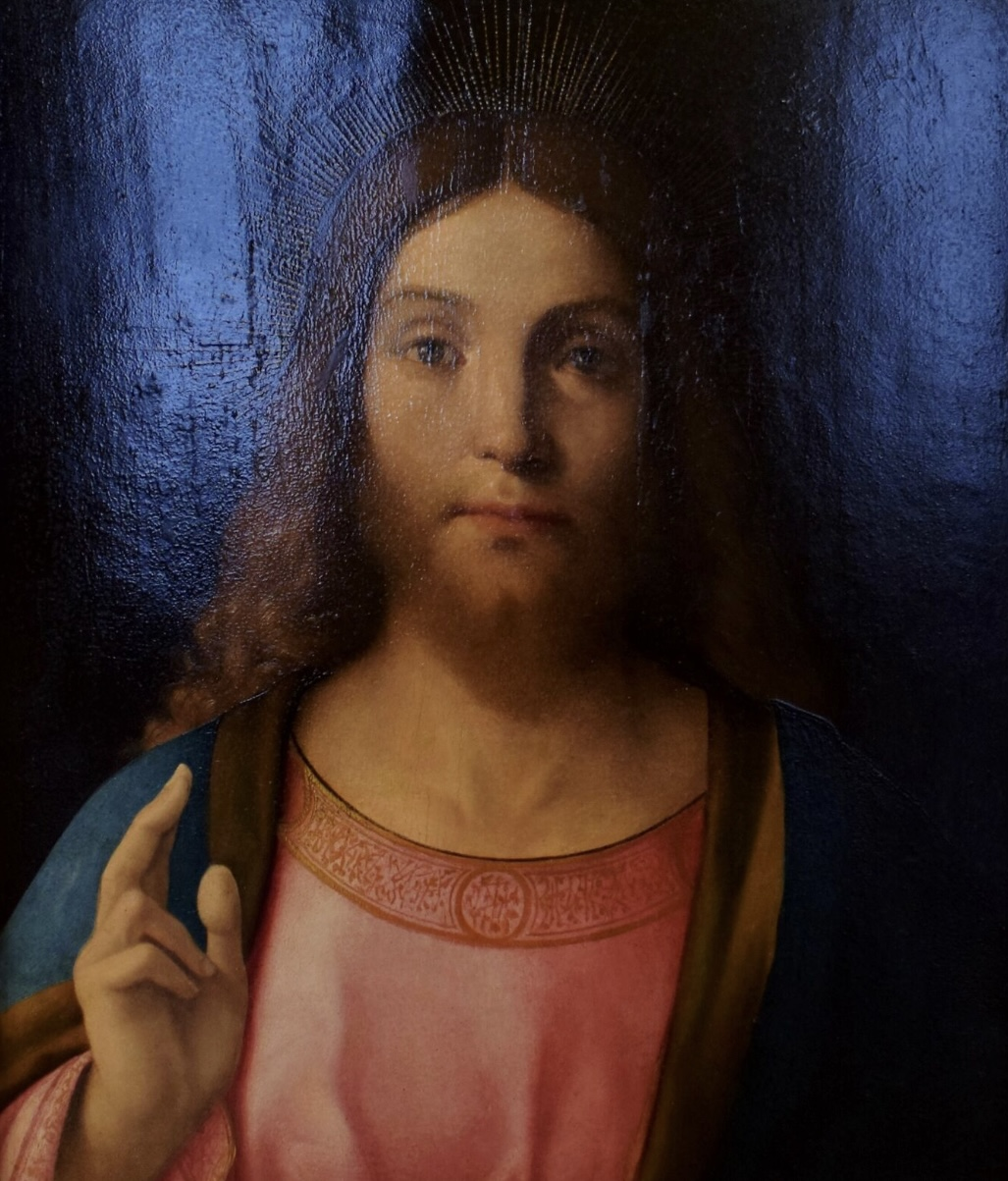
Giovanni Bellini, Cristo benedicente (c. 1480–1530) Galleria Nazionale d'Arte Antica di Palazzo Barberini, Rome

== See also ==
- The Lost Leonardo, 2021 film about the painting
- List of works by Leonardo da Vinci
- List of most expensive paintings

== Sources ==
- Dalivalle, Margaret; Kemp, Martin; Simon, Robert (2019). Leonardo's Salvator Mundi & the Collecting of Leonardo in the Stuart Courts. Oxford, United Kingdom: Oxford University Press. ISBN 978-0-19-881383-5.
- Kemp, Martin (2019). Leonardo da Vinci: The 100 Milestones. New York, New York, US: Sterling. ISBN 978-1-4549-3042-6.
- Lewis, Ben (2019). The Last Leonardo: The Secret Lives of the World's Most Expensive Painting. New York: Ballantine Books. ISBN 978-1-984819-25-3.
- Marani, Pietro C. (2003) [2000]. Leonardo da Vinci: The Complete Paintings. New York, New York, US: Harry N. Abrams. ISBN 978-0-8109-3581-5.
- Pedretti, Carlo (1982) [1973]. Leonardo: A Study in Chronology and Style (First Johnson Reprint Corporation ed.). New York: Harcourt Brace Jovanovich. ISBN 0-384-45281-7.
- Shaer, Matthew (14 April 2019). "The Invention of the 'Salvator Mundi'". Vulture. New York Magazine. Archived from the original on 15 April 2019.
- Snow-Smith, Joanne (1982). The Salvator Mundi of Leonardo da Vinci. Seattle: Henry Art Gallery, University of Washington. ISBN 978-0-935558-11-1.
- Syson, Luke; Keith, Larry; Galansino, Arturo; Mazzotta, Antoni; Nethersole, Scott; Rumberg, Per (2011). Leonardo da Vinci: Painter at the Court of Milan. London, UK: National Gallery. ISBN 978-1-85709-491-6.
- Zöllner, Frank (2019) [2003]. Leonardo da Vinci: The Complete Paintings and Drawings (Anniversary ed.). Cologne, Germany: Taschen. ISBN 978-3-8365-7625-3.
- Zitzlsperger, Philipp (2024). The Meaning of Leonardo’s Salvator Mundi. In: artibus et historiae, Bd. 90 (2024), S. 57–76.
