= Tornado outbreak of March 14–15, 2008 =

2008 tornado outbreak in the United States

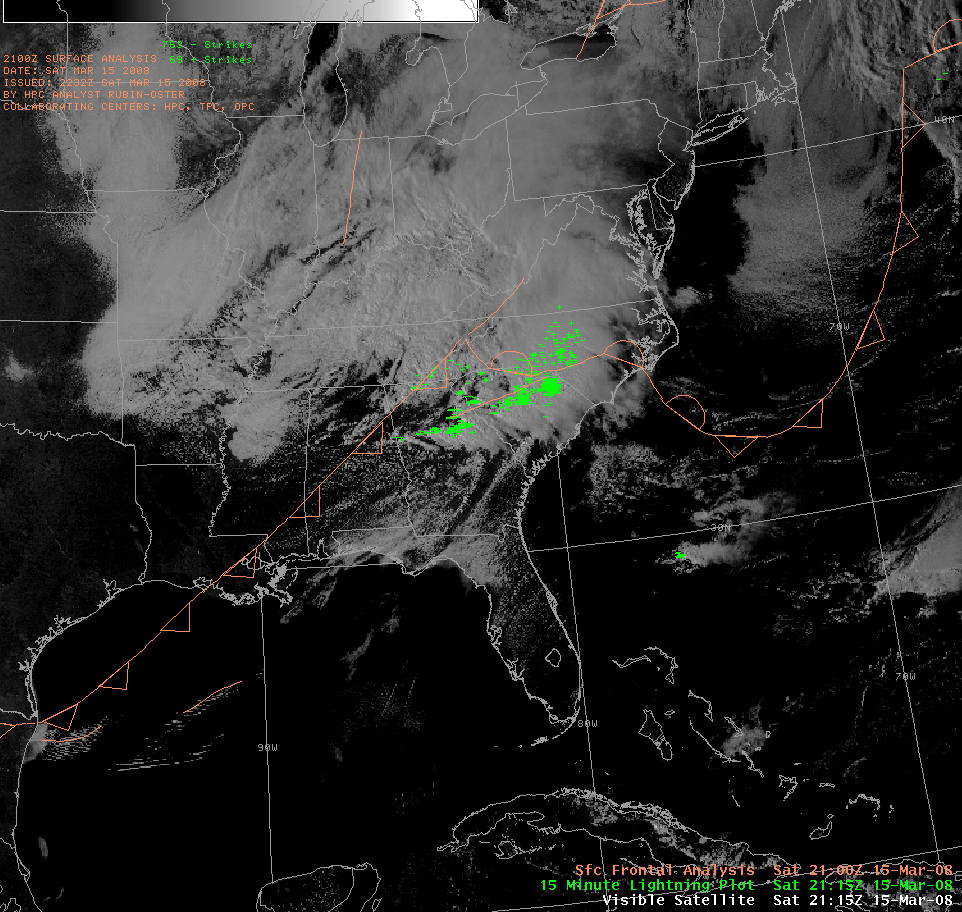
- Photo of the March 15, 2008 Storm system near South Carolina

Meteorological history
- Date: March 14–15, 2008

Tornado outbreak
- Tornadoes: 46 confirmed
- Max. rating: EF3 tornado
- Duration: 24 hours, 7 minutes
- Highest winds: Tornadic – 150 mph (240 km/h) (Bartow County, Georgia EF3 on March 15)
- Highest gusts: Non-tornadic – 84 mph (135 km/h) near Myrtle Beach, South Carolina on March 15
- Largest hail: 4.25 in (10.8 cm) – in diameter in Iva, South Carolina on March 15

Overall effects
- Casualties: 5 deaths, 53 injuries
- Damage: $1,700,000,000 (2008 USD)
- Areas affected: Alabama, Georgia, North Carolina, South Carolina
- Part of the tornado outbreaks of 2008

A destructive and deadly tornado outbreak affected the Southeastern United States on March 14–15, 2008. The most infamous tornado of the outbreak occurred on March 14 when an isolated EF2 tornado caused widespread damage across Downtown Atlanta, Georgia, including to the CNN Center and to the Georgia Dome, which was hosting the 2008 SEC men's basketball tournament. Other buildings that were damaged include the Georgia World Congress Center, and the Omni Hotel, which was evacuated after many windows were blown out. The Westin Peachtree Plaza Hotel suffered major window damage. The image of the building with all its windows blown out became famous and for a time was a symbol of the tornado. Centennial Olympic Park, SunTrust Plaza (now Truist Plaza) and historic Oakland Cemetery were also damaged.

One man was killed near Downtown Atlanta and 30 others were injured. Two other deaths took place on March 15, in the northern Atlanta suburbs, from a second, larger round of severe weather and tornadoes. In total, 46 tornadoes were confirmed over the 24-hour period, from eastern Alabama to the Carolina coast, with most of the activity concentrated in the Metropolitan Atlanta area, the Central Savannah River Area and the Midlands of South Carolina.

== Meteorological synopsis ==
=== Background ===
As early as March 9, the possibility of severe weather was noted by the Storm Prediction Center. Numerous quickly moving troughs were expected to move across states around the Gulf of Mexico. High uncertainty of timing and continuity in the forecast for the late week was present. Although, the considerable amount of uncertainty, there was confidence in some severe weather in the middle and later portions of the week. Predictability of the event was too low to have a defined area where severe weather was expected. The following day, on March 10, the Global Forecast System (GFS) and the ECMWF weather models came into agreement on mid-high level flow. Moisture in the atmosphere was forecasted to slowly return. Timing of moisture arrival was said to change the intensity of thunderstorms, along with the potential of severe weather. The uncertainty of the placement of the frontal zone led to the Storm Prediction Center not outlining an area where severe thunderstorms could occur, though confidence was high for strong to severe storms occurring near areas near the Mississippi Valley and the Tennessee Valley for late in the week. On March 11, an area extending from Arkansas to Alabama highlighted a >30% risk of severe weather for March 14. Mid level disturbances in the atmosphere were forecasted to pull moisture into an area with vertical wind shear. On March 11, the area with the highest risk of severe weather was in Arkansas and Louisiana. The potential for severe weather beyond March 14 was noted by the SPC. On March 12, a slight risk (1/3) of severe weather was outlined by the Storm Prediction Center. The risk extended from central Oklahoma to far southern Illinois to the Florida panhandle. Forecasted soundings presented the high likelihood of supercells, along with tornadoes. That same day, a 30% risk of severe weather was outlined for March 15. The risk area extended from Alabama to states along the Atlantic Ocean. The following day, on March 13, a slight risk was maintained for the Day 2 Convective Outlook. In addition, a different slight risk was outlined for the Southeastern United States. Wind shear and instability were forecasted to support the development of isolated supercells. Storms were forecast to move into the Carolinas as March 15 went on. Elevated supercells on March 14 were expected to bring large hail, which was the then primary forecasted threat. On March 14, the Day 1 0600 UTC Convective Outlook maintained a slight risk. A relatively small 5% risk of tornadoes extended from northern Oklahoma to Arkansas, with an additional 2% tornado risk extending from Oklahoma to Florida. A 15% risk of damaging winds extended from mostly the same areas as the tornado risk. The risk for large hail was up to 30%, which was located mostly over Arkansas. A 15% risk of large hail surrounded the 30% risk, stretching from southeastern Kansas to Georgia. The forecast for March 15 on the March 14 1730 UTC Day 2 Convective Outlook maintained a slight risk, with the highest risk of severe weather being over South Carolina. By the morning of March 15, a moderate risk (2/3) was outlined for north Georgia and South Carolina. A 15% risk for tornadoes was placed over both states, along with a risk for significant (EF2+) tornadoes. A 30% risk of damaging winds and large hail were both located on the two states. Later in the day, the moderate risk was extended to include southern North Carolina. On the 2000 UTC Day 1 Convective Outlook, a high risk for severe weather was outlined. A 30% risk of tornadoes was located over eastern Georgia and western South Carolina.

=== March 14 ===
In their 9:00 pm EDT outlook, the Storm Prediction Center issued a slight risk of severe weather across portions of the southern United States from Oklahoma to Georgia, with a 2% risk for tornadoes for the Atlanta area. A tornado warning was issued for Atlanta at 9:26 pm when the supercell that caused the tornado was 6 miles (10 km) northwest of downtown, although no watches were in effect for the area due to the low probability. The tornado moved to the southeast, which is unusual as most supercells have a strong northward component along (or ahead of) a cold front. It also was unusual because it was not associated with such a squall line at all, but was an independent supercell well ahead of the main storm system.

A Shortwave trough was expected to move into the central United States. Strong vertical wind shear existed due to mid-level flow. Supercells were expected to develop in Kansas and Oklahoma. Lapse rates up to 7.5 C/km supported the development of hail. An isolated occurrence of damaging winds and a tornado was possible. In the Ozarks, a 75-85 knot jet moved from the west, going into the region. Storms were most likely to initiate north of a warm front in Arkansas. Wind shear was expected to increase as a low-level jet approached the area. Supercells that tracked north of the warm front had the potential to produce tornadoes. In north Georgia, CAPE values had risen up to 1030 J/kg. In addition, 3-CAPE values were at 106 J/kg. Storm relative helicity values were near 215 m2/s2. Wind in the low-level areas of the atmosphere were near 30-40 knots, while upper-level winds were over 100 knots.

=== March 15 ===
Another tornado outbreak struck the southeast the following day. A moderate risk for severe storms was issued in the morning, and maintained through the afternoon. However, by mid afternoon, areas of east-central Georgia and central South Carolina were upgraded to a high risk of severe storms due to the tornado threat. On March 11, forecasters noted potential of severe weather. The Global Forecast System (GFS) weather model predicted severe weather for the 15th of March. Confidence wasn't high because the amount of CAPE and Wind shear was uncertain. Models had conflicting information. The GFS and the NAM had different locations of surface lows & convection. The NAM had a surface low pressure in North Carolina.

By the morning of the 15th, favorable ingredients appeared, which made severe weather likely. Instability values were over 1000 J/kg. The highest values were up to 2000 J/kg. Mid level lapse rates were above 7 °C/km. A low & upper level jet were both present in South Carolina. At this time, 60 knot (69 mph) winds were observed at 850 hPa and 86 knots (98 mph) at 500 hPa. From the surface to 850 hPa, extremely moist layer was observed. The layer was capped by a temperature inversion. The surface had a temperature of around 70°f (21°c) while dew points remained around 65°f (18°c). Helicity values were up to 600 m^{2}/s^{2}. A boundary started to draw dew points northward. Eventually, the inversion cooled which allowed for instability to release. This allowed for storms to fire. A warm front became the primary forcing mechanism for storms. Favorable instability, up to 404 J/kg in the hail growth zone. 10-30 °C temperatures in the hail growth zone along with instability allowed for quarter sized hail, but some areas had >2 inch sized hail.

A linear line of thunderstorms had reached North Carolina and South Carolina. By 4:15 PM EDT, the storms had made it into South Carolina. The Storm Prediction Center issued a PDS tornado watch extending from Georgia to central North Carolina.

== Confirmed tornadoes ==
Confirmed tornadoes by Enhanced Fujita rating
EFU	EF0	EF1	EF2	EF3	EF4	EF5	Total
0	11	16	16	3	0	0	46

=== March 14 event ===
List of confirmed tornadoes – Friday, March 14, 2008 (Note: All dates are based on the local time zone where the tornado touched down; however, all times are in Coordinated Universal Time for consistency.)
EF#	Location	County / Parish	State	Start Coord.	Time (UTC)	Path length	Max width	Damage (Note: All damage totals are in 2008 USD unless otherwise stated.)	Summary
EF2	N of Warren	Cleveland	AR	33.7201°N 92.1632°W	0842–0855	9.4 mi (15.1 km)	350 yd (320 m)	$1,000,000	An old, unoccupied house was destroyed. Several houses sustained roof and shingle damage, including two that had most of their roofs blown off. Several chicken houses were destroyed, and a number of barns and outbuildings were damaged. Hundreds of trees were downed; one destroyed a house trailer.
EF2	Atlanta	Fulton, DeKalb	GA	33.765°N 84.43°W	0138–0150	6.25 mi (10.06 km)	200 yd (180 m)	$25,050,000	1 death – See article on this tornado – 30 people were injured.

=== March 15 event ===
List of confirmed tornadoes – Saturday, March 15, 2008
EF#	Location	County / Parish	State	Start Coord.	Time (UTC)	Path length	Max width	Damage	Summary
EF2	SE of Oneonta	Blount	AL	33.8716°N 86.4459°W	1447–1457	6.04 mi (9.72 km)	675 yd (617 m)	$960,000	The Appalachian School property sustained damage, several hundred trees were snapped or uprooted, and many chicken houses were damaged or destroyed. Many garages, sheds, and outbuildings were destroyed. At least 25 homes sustained major damage while dozens more sustained lesser damage. A mobile home was destroyed and several others were damaged, a few feed silos were tipped over and rolled, and hundreds of livestock were killed by flying debris.
EF2	N of Piedmont	Cherokee	AL	33.9835°N 85.6295°W	1550–1554	3.61 mi (5.81 km)	50 yd (46 m)	$75,000	Metal roofing panels were torn from a barn, and half the roof was torn from a brick house. Two other homes and a barn also sustained structural damage. Numerous trees were snapped or uprooted.
EF3	NW of Aragon to W of Emerson	Polk, Floyd, Bartow	GA	34.09°N 85.11°W	1625–1645	16.93 mi (27.25 km)	880 yd (800 m)	$7,500,000	2 deaths – A significant tornado began in Polk County, affecting 16 houses; 4 were destroyed (killing an occupant), 2 sustained major damage, 5 sustained minor damage, and 5 sustained even lesser damage. Several county outbuildings, barns, shops, vehicles, a motor home, a travel trailer, a dog kennel business, and several fences were heavily damaged. Hundreds of trees and power lines were downed, including several high tension power line support structures that were heavily impacted. Another 20 homes were impacted in Floyd County, with 10 destroyed (killing an occupant) and 10 affected insignificantly. Approximately 55 homes were affected in Bartow County, of which 6 were destroyed and 30 sustained minor damage. Taylorsville Elementary and Woodland High School sustained major damage, and some Georgia Power high transmission towers were toppled.
EF0	S of Royston	Franklin, Hart	GA	34.273°N 83.176°W	1844–1851	3.24 mi (5.21 km)	20 yd (18 m)	$0	Trees and power lines were downed; a tree fell on a home.
EF0	NE of Abbeville	Abbeville	SC	34.2414°N 82.3058°W	1943	0.5 mi (0.80 km)	20 yd (18 m)	$0	Trees and power lines were downed.
EF1	NE of Winnsboro to SE of Kershaw	Fairfield, Kershaw	SC	34.45°N 80.97°W	2010–2039	24.22 mi (38.98 km)	80 yd (73 m)	$0	A long-tracked tornado snapped or uprooted numerous trees onto secondary roadways.
EF2	SSW of Calhoun Falls	Elbert	GA	34.0074°N 82.7341°W	2019–2030	8.04 mi (12.94 km)	100 yd (91 m)	$100,000	Numerous trees were snapped or uprooted, two homes sustained heavy roof damage, a boat dock was tossed 25 ft (8.3 yd), and power lines were downed.
EF3	Silverstreet to Prosperity to N of Chapin	Newberry, Richland	SC	34.23°N 81.76°W	2025–2047	27.51 mi (44.27 km)	1,320 yd (1,210 m)	$10,000	Many residences were heavily damaged, a few mobile homes sustained moderate damage, numerous trees were snapped or uprooted, and power lines were downed. Two people were injured.
EF1	SE of Calhoun Falls	Lincoln, McCormick	GA, SC	33.96°N 82.593°W	2028–2047	12.62 mi (20.31 km)	440 yd (400 m)	Unknown	Several mobile homes sustained minor to moderate damage, and numerous trees were downed.
EF2	W of Camden to NW of Bethune	Kershaw	SC	34.27°N 80.72°W	2030–2050	23.04 mi (37.08 km)	660 yd (600 m)	Unknown	Several homes and mobiles homes sustained moderate damage, mainly in the form of partially torn off roofs. A building on a poultry farm had its entire roof ripped off as well.
EF1	N of McBee	Chesterfield	SC	34.545°N 80.3°W	2047–2100	6.97 mi (11.22 km)	110 yd (100 m)	$25,000	A few mobile homes and a water tower sustained minor damage, while many trees and power lines were downed.
EF2	ENE of McCormick to SW of Monetta	McCormick, Edgefield, Saluda	SC	33.95°N 82.19°W	2102–2130	32.67 mi (52.58 km)	660 yd (600 m)	Unknown	Numerous trees and power lines were downed. One house and one mobile home were severely damaged, a second mobile home was split in two by a fallen tree, and several other houses and mobile homes sustained minor damage.
EF2	Elgin	Kershaw	SC	34.18°N 80.83°W	2122–2131	6.89 mi (11.09 km)	1,230 yd (1,120 m)	Unknown	Many houses had portions of its their roofs ripped off, four mobile homes were destroyed, and numerous trees and power lines were downed. Two people were injured.
EF0	Lugoff	Kershaw	SC	34.22°N 80.67°W	2133	0.5 mi (0.80 km)	100 yd (91 m)	Unknown	Several homes sustained minor damage, and trees were downed.
EF0	SE of Monetta	Aiken	SC	33.8183°N 81.581°W	2137–2138	0.5 mi (0.80 km)	100 yd (91 m)	$0	Trees were downed.
EF2	WNW of Pelion	Lexington	SC	33.8°N 81.385°W	2141–2154	8.33 mi (13.41 km)	440 yd (400 m)	Unknown	A mobile home was severely damaged, farm irrigation equipment was rolled and twisted, and numerous trees and power lines were downed. Several other mobile homes sustained lesser damage.
EF1	SE of Blythewood	Richland	SC	34.17°N 80.93°W	2143–2150	3.7 mi (6.0 km)	660 yd (600 m)	Unknown	A few homes had their roofs torn off while others only had portions removed. Numerous trees and power lines were downed.
EF0	S of Latta	Dillon	SC	34.3288°N 79.4366°W	2148–2150	1.36 mi (2.19 km)	75 yd (69 m)	$50,000	A large tree fell on a home; other trees were downed or damaged. Six homes sustained minor damage, and one trailer sustained major damage.
EF1	NE of Thomson	McDuffie, Columbia	GA	33.6°N 82.49°W	2148–2203	9.9 mi (15.9 km)	440 yd (400 m)	$140,000	One mobile home was destroyed and several others sustained moderate damage. Numerous trees and power lines were downed. Two people were injured.
EF2	NW of Woodford to St. Matthews to N of Elloree	Calhoun	SC	33.705°N 81.017°W	2210–2238	24.39 mi (39.25 km)	440 yd (400 m)	Unknown	Several mobile homes sustained severe damage while other houses had their roofs ripped off. Several outbuildings were damaged, a few barns collapsed, and numerous trees were downed.
EF0	NE of Evans	Edgefield	SC	33.57°N 82.04°W	2211–2213	3.74 mi (6.02 km)	220 yd (200 m)	$0	Several trees were downed.
EF0	SW of Jackson	Butts	GA	33.247°N 84.057°W	2215–2219	4.42 mi (7.11 km)	100 yd (91 m)	$150,000	A total of 136 homes sustained minor damage, a barn was destroyed, and many trees were downed.
EF2	Wrens to Matthews to N of Waynesboro	Jefferson, Burke	GA	33.2102°N 82.3922°W	2215–2245	22.07 mi (35.52 km)	880 yd (800 m)	$500,000	Several mobile homes were destroyed. Two businesses and a church were destroyed. Several other businesses, another church, and numerous homes were damaged. Numerous trees and power lines were downed.
EF0	Fair Bluff	Columbus	NC	34.3073°N 79.0373°W	2216–2217	0.02 mi (0.032 km)	10 yd (9.1 m)	Unknown	Several trees were snapped.
EF2	E of Augusta to W of Williston	Aiken, Barnwell	SC	33.49°N 81.9°W	2218–2248	25.51 mi (41.05 km)	1,760 yd (1,610 m)	Unknown	Many homes sustained extensive damage to their roofs and structures. A water tower had its top ripped off and deposited several hundred yards away.
EF1	S of Timmonsville	Florence	SC	34.0811°N 80.0108°W	2225–2240	13.45 mi (21.65 km)	100 yd (91 m)	$605,000	One house was destroyed while four others sustained major damage and seventy six others sustained minor damage. Nine mobile homes were completely destroyed, five mobile homes sustained major damage, and eight mobile homes sustained minor damage. Two businesses sustained major damage, thirteen barns and outbuildings were destroyed (and 3 others sustained major damage), and three people were injured.
EF2	N of Mayesville	Lee	SC	34.125°N 80.32°W	2252–2305	14.08 mi (22.66 km)	440 yd (400 m)	Unknown	Several houses, mobile homes, and a church sustained moderate to major damage. Numerous trees and power lines were downed.
EF0	E of Elko	Barnwell	SC	33.379°N 81.36°W	2254–2255	0.58 mi (0.93 km)	100 yd (91 m)	$0	Trees were downed in a convergent pattern.
EF1	S of Manning	Clarendon	SC	33.53°N 80.1°W	2258–2311	8.61 mi (13.86 km)	220 yd (200 m)	Unknown	Many trees and power lines were downed. A few homes sustained minor to moderate damage.
EF1	Denmark	Bamberg	SC	33.32°N 81.1327°W	2305–2307	1.96 mi (3.15 km)	220 yd (200 m)	Unknown	Utility poles were snapped, trees and power lines were downed, and several houses sustained moderate damage.
EF1	NE of Waynesboro to Girard to NE of Sardis	Burke	GA	33.1°N 81.9°W	2305–2315	15.23 mi (24.51 km)	440 yd (400 m)	$100,000	Numerous trees and power lines were downed. One home had its windows broken, siding severely damaged, and part of the roof ripped off. Several mobile homes sustained minor to moderate damage.
EF2	S of Martin to Allendale to NE of Fairfax	Allendale	SC	33.03°N 81.5°W	2312–2335	18 mi (29 km)	1,320 yd (1,210 m)	$2,300,000	Approximately 1,500 to 2,000 trees were snapped, two mobile homes were destroyed, a cell phone tower was toppled, and inflicted mainly minor roof damage to dozens of residences. Numerous power lines and power poles were downed, several barns, sheds, and outbuildings were destroyed, and an empty tractor trailer was overturned. One person was injured.
EF0	Aynor	Horry	SC	33.9943°N 79.2028°W	2313–2314	0.27 mi (0.43 km)	25 yd (23 m)	$5,000	A mobile home, trees, and power lines were damaged. A carport was destroyed.
EF1	S of Greeleyville	Williamsburg	SC	33.5375°N 80°W	2317–2320	2.49 mi (4.01 km)	75 yd (69 m)	Unknown	Numerous large hardwood trees were snapped or uprooted.
EF1	SE of Bamberg	Bamberg	SC	33.24°N 80.93°W	2325–2329	3.76 mi (6.05 km)	660 yd (600 m)	Unknown	Numerous trees were downed in a convergent path.
EF3	Branchville	Orangeburg	SC	33.24°N 80.865°W	2329–2344	10.11 mi (16.27 km)	1,320 yd (1,210 m)	$1,700,000 (2008 USD)	One residence was destroyed and sixteen others sustained minor to moderate damage. One mobile home was destroyed and six others sustained minor to moderate damage. Seven buildings were destroyed, including a couple of three-layer deep brick buildings; eighteen others sustained minor to major damage.
EF1	E of Lane	Williamsburg	SC	33.4923°N 79.7139°W	2336–2340	4.01 mi (6.45 km)	75 yd (69 m)	$200,000	Thirty-five homes were damaged, of which seven suffered major damage and five were completely destroyed.
EF0	NW of Georgetown	Georgetown	SC	33.4848°N 79.3726°W	2354–2355	0.01 mi (0.016 km)	25 yd (23 m)	Unknown	Eight trees were downed; one home sustained significant damage from a fallen tree, with its porch damaged and foundation shifted.
EF1	Hampstead	Pender	NC	34.3676°N 77.7145°W	2356–2359	1.99 mi (3.20 km)	100 yd (91 m)	$2,000,000	Eighteen homes were affected, of which fifteen sustained minor damage and three sustained major damage. Five mobile homes sustained minor damage while two sustained moderate damage. Ten businesses sustained minor damage, and an additional three sustained moderate damage. Trees were snapped.
EF1	N of Ridgeville	Dorchester	SC	33.11°N 80.32°W	0008–0011	2.2 mi (3.5 km)	40 yd (37 m)	$218,000	Roof panels were ripped from the canopy at Carters fast stop gas station, two mobile homes were damaged (with one shifted 5 ft (1.7 yd) off its foundation and the other having its windows and doors blown out), and a car was moved approximately 50 ft (17 yd).
EF1	N of Mount Holly	Berkeley	SC	33.06°N 80.03°W	0025–0026	0.6 mi (0.97 km)	180 yd (160 m)	$150,000	Two mobile homes sustained extensive damage, six mobile homes sustained moderate damage, and six mobile homes sustained minor damage. Large trees were snapped and uprooted. Seven people were injured.
EF1	ENE of Goose Creek	Berkeley	SC	33.05°N 79.85°W	0036–0038	1.2 mi (1.9 km)	135 yd (123 m)	$200,000	A large storage shed was severely damaged, several large trees were downed. Mount Zion Methodist Church sustained complete failure of its front porch and had a portion of the roof deck uplifted; its steeple was toppled and portions of the outer brick wall sustained severe damage as well.
EF2	NE of Springfield	Effingham	GA	32.39°N 81.31°W	0134–0143	7 mi (11 km)	440 yd (400 m)	$1,500,000	Three mobile homes were destroyed, three to four dozen residences were damaged, and fifteen high voltage transmission towers were toppled. Twenty vehicles were damaged or destroyed, and numerous outbuildings, sheds, and barns were destroyed. Six people were injured.
EF2	NE of Rincon	Effingham	GA	32.33°N 81.2°W	0144–0145	0.5 mi (0.80 km)	100 yd (91 m)	$3,000,000	A water cooling tower was destroyed and a second was damaged. Several buildings were damaged, two high voltage transmission towers were toppled, and several dozen trees were snapped or uprooted. Tractor trailer cargo containers were tossed up to 100 yd (91 m).

=== Atlanta, Georgia ===
Atlanta, Georgia
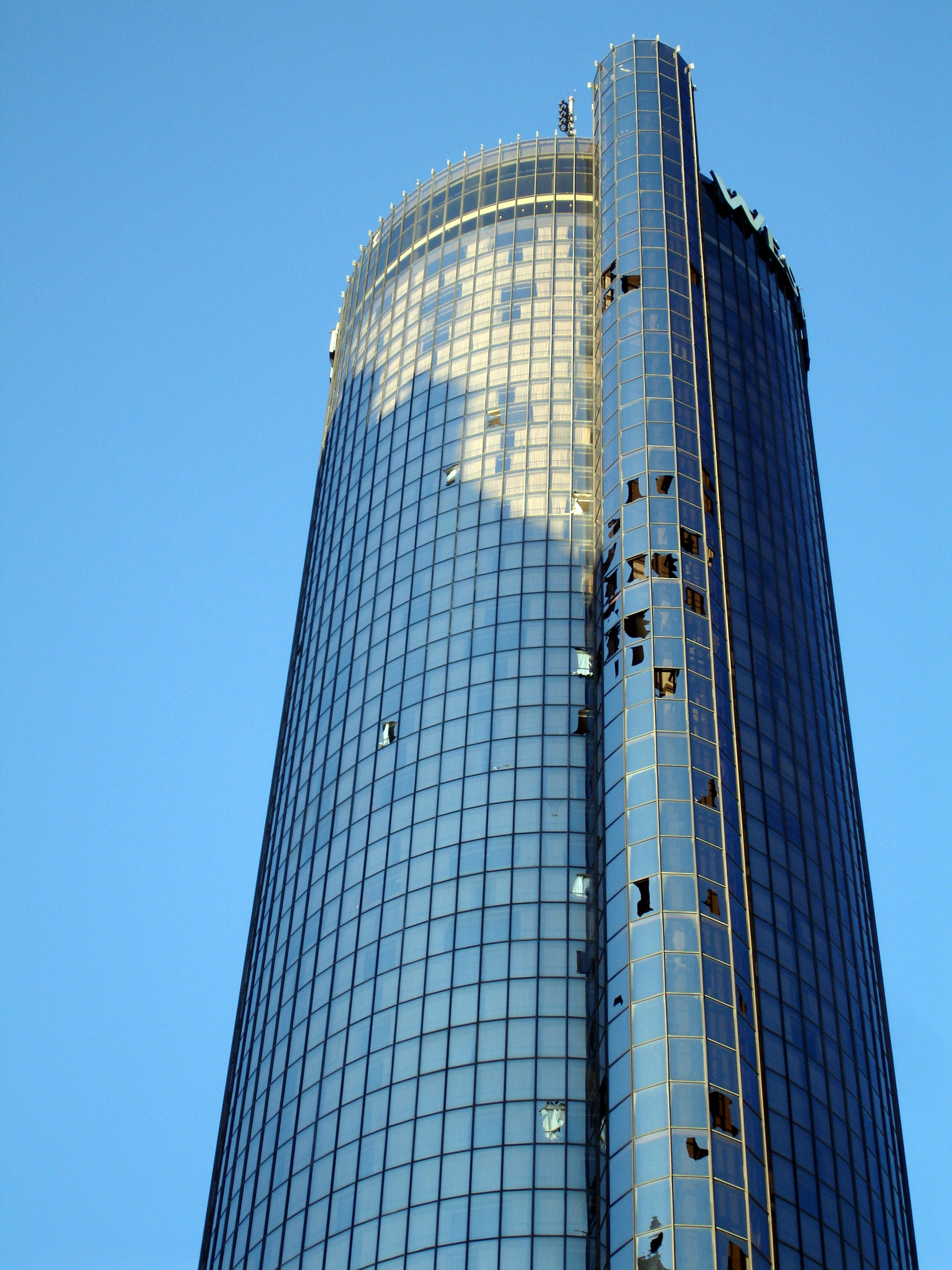
- Westin Peachtree Plaza Hotel tornado damage; the other side of the building had even worse damage.

Meteorological history
- Formed: March 14, 2008, 9:38 p.m. EDT (UTC−04:00)
- Dissipated: March 14, 2008, 9:50 p.m. EDT (UTC−04:00)
- Duration: 12 minutes

EF2 tornado
- on the Enhanced Fujita scale
- Highest winds: 130 mph (210 km/h)

Overall effects
- Fatalities: 1
- Injuries: 30

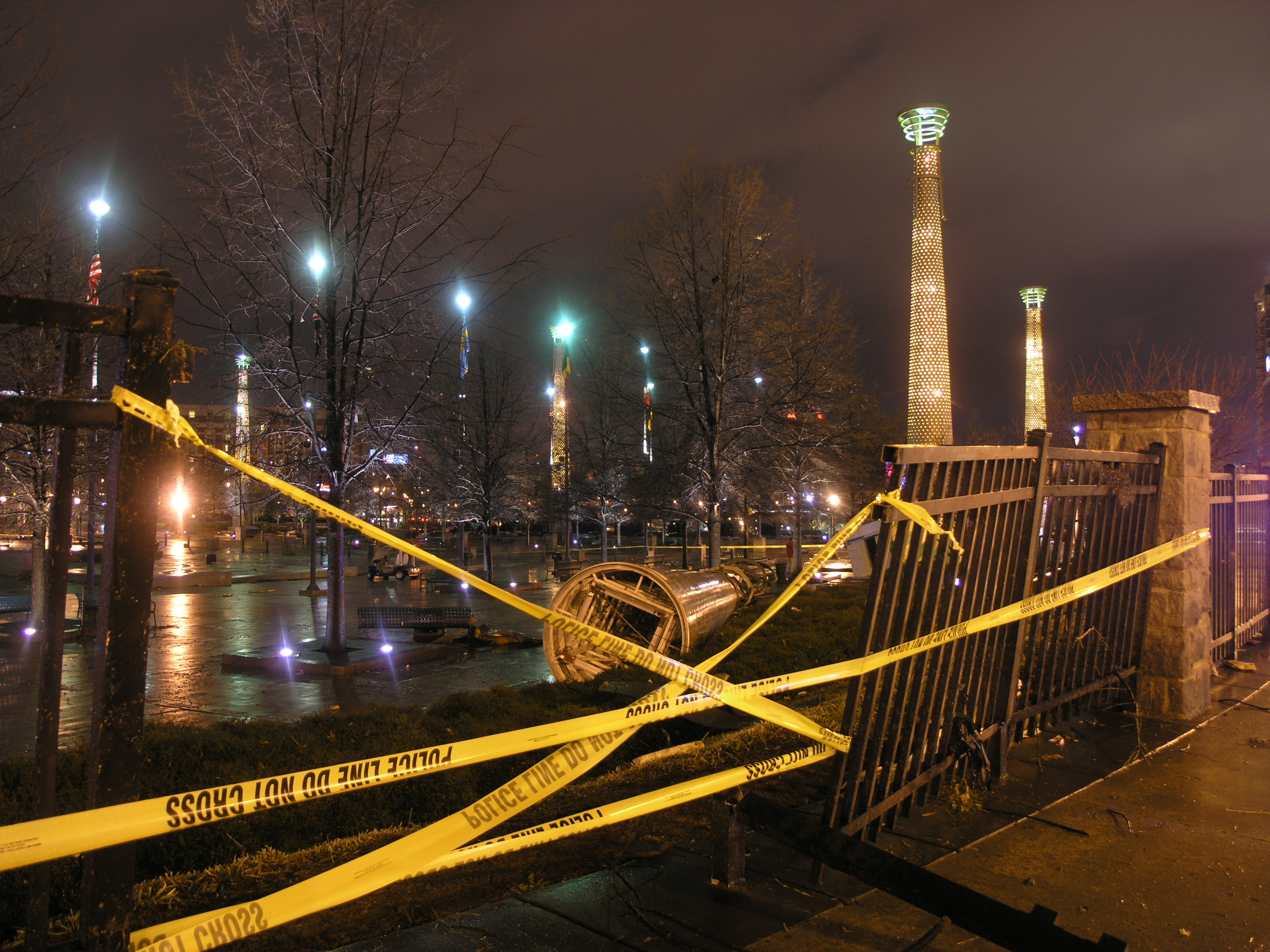
Damage to Centennial Olympic Park

This strong and costly EF2 tornado caused the CNN Center to be severely damaged, including over 1,600 shattered windows and roof damage which resulted in flooding of the atrium. The Georgia World Congress Center also sustained serious damage to the roofs of all 3 buildings and to over 4,500 windows, as was the Omni Hotel, especially the skywalk between the two hotel towers over Andrew Young International Boulevard. This complex alone lost 476 windows, making it necessary to close the south tower to guests. The facades of the Georgia Dome and a Philips Arena parking garage were damaged while hosting basketball games.

Two of the giant columns in Centennial Olympic Park were knocked down, and insulation was stuck in trees. Trees on some other streets were blown completely down, despite being too early in spring to involve leaf drag. Glass was strewn across several streets, and Atlanta Police kept residents, hotel guests, and news crews away from buildings with falling glass, which continued to pose a danger into the night. Cars in the area were also damaged, and hotel and office furniture was found scattered about.

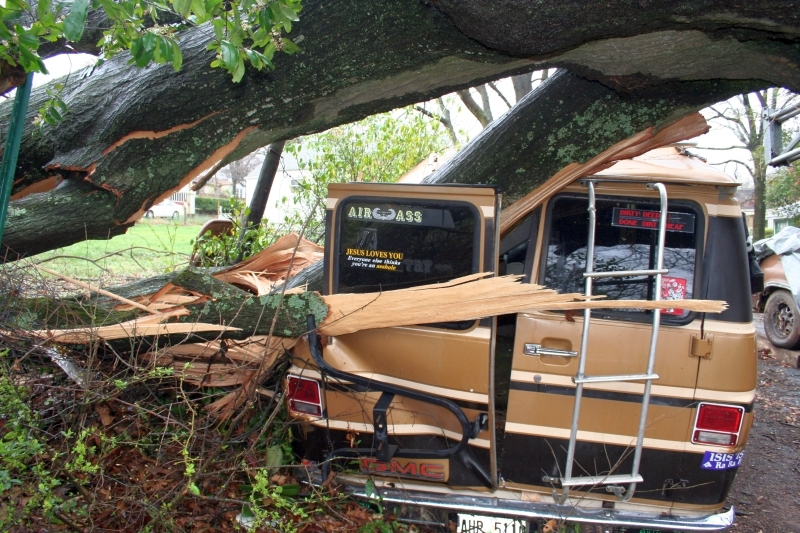
A 100-year-old water oak tree crushes a GMC van in the North Ormewood Park neighborhood.

The Ritz Carlton, Westin Peachtree Plaza, Georgia-Pacific Building, SunTrust Plaza (where more than 60 people had to be relocated out of their offices), Equitable Building, and Georgia State University also had windows blown out (300 at Equitable alone), as did the Tabernacle (a former church with stained glass that is now a concert venue). The windows of the Westin continued to fall for days after the tornado, forcing police to keep several city blocks and MARTA's Peachtree Center station closed to pedestrians. The Georgia World Congress Center also sustained flooding while hosting a JROTC event and the Hinman Dental Meeting; Fox Sports Net took footage of a staircase in the new section of the complex that looked like a fountain with water cascading down it. The annual Atlanta Home Show and all other events were cancelled for the weekend in the GWCC complex, as was the Atlanta St. Patrick's Day Parade scheduled for the next day. WRAS FM at Georgia State University was off the air for two days, though it was not stated whether its studio or tower sustained damage, or if this was due to security or safety concerns, or power outages. The historic Rialto Theatre at GSU also sustained roof damage, which caused water damage inside.

Further east, Grady Hospital reported some damage to windows and a power outage. Many of the injured were taken there, and some walked there and were treated in the emergency room for cuts due to glass. The King Memorial MARTA station was damaged and was being bypassed by trains, with buses rerouted to the next station on each side. Oakland Cemetery suffered major damage to monuments and to its huge oaks and magnolias, and the caretaker found window blinds around the neck of a statue of a Civil War veteran buried there.

In the nearby Cabbagetown area, a brick loft building (well known for the fire that occurred there in 1999, during its renovation from the Fulton Bag and Cotton Mills, in which the crane operator was rescued by helicopter during live TV news coverage) lost part of its roof, and part of the top (fifth) floor. Another building at The Stacks on Boulevard was damaged; search and rescue personnel were unable to enter, but everyone was accounted for by the management within a few hours.

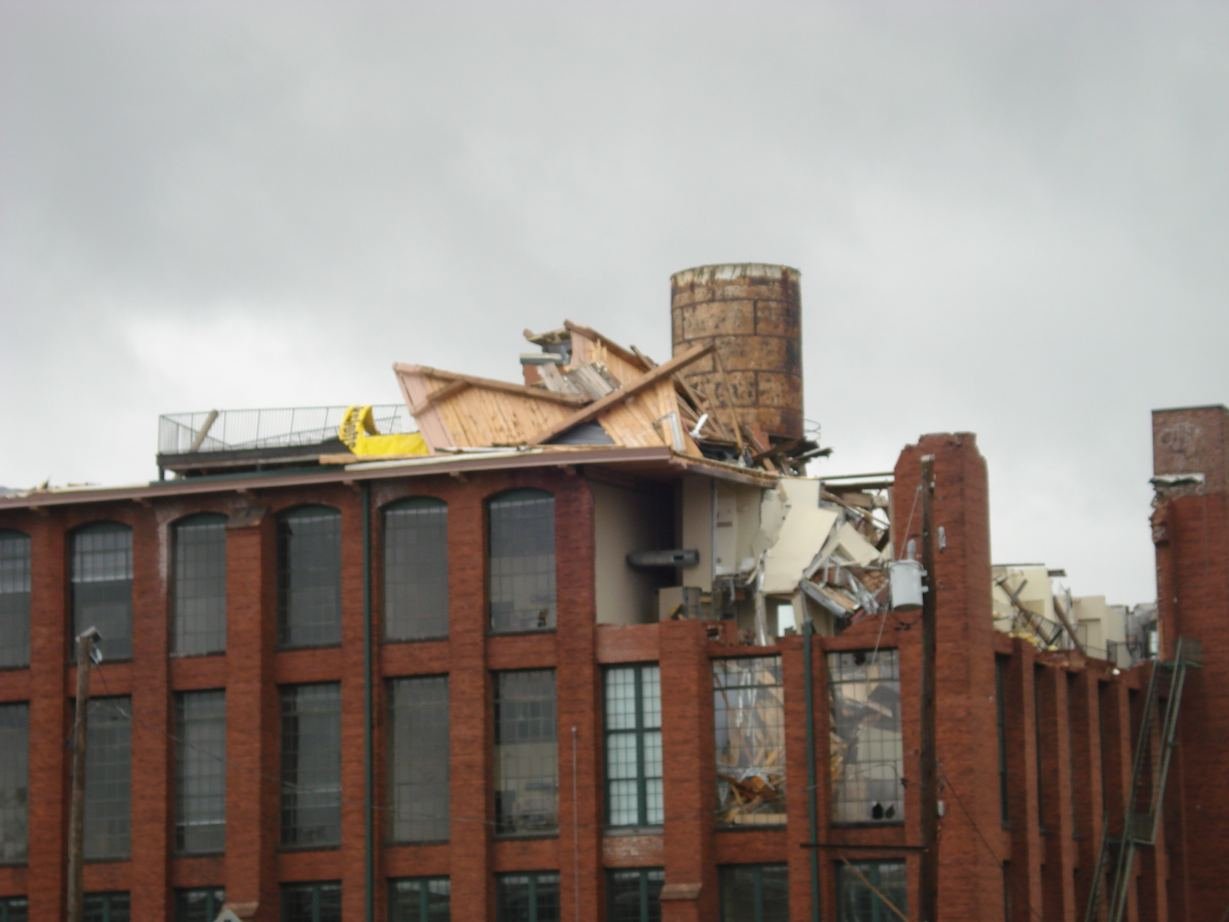
The Atlanta tornado severely damaged this Loft building.

When the tornado hit, a SEC tournament game between Mississippi State and Alabama which had just been sent into overtime minutes earlier by a shot from Mykal Riley, was in progress at the Georgia Dome and being broadcast live on television. The storm ripped panels from the exterior of the building and tore two holes in the roof of the Dome, causing insulation to fall and the scoreboard and catwalks suspended from the roof to sway; much of this was captured on camera, though the transmission from the arena was interrupted. Riley's shot was considered to have saved lives by keeping people safe inside the Georgia Dome. After a 64-minute delay, the game was completed; however the next scheduled game between Kentucky and Georgia was postponed. The remainder of the tournament games were played at Alexander Memorial Coliseum on the campus of Georgia Tech, with spectators restricted to team and conference personnel, media, team bands, and families of players only due to the much smaller size of the alternate venue. At the nearby Philips Arena, little disruption was noticed by the attendees during the game between the Hawks and the Los Angeles Clippers, even though damage occurred to the outside of the arena.

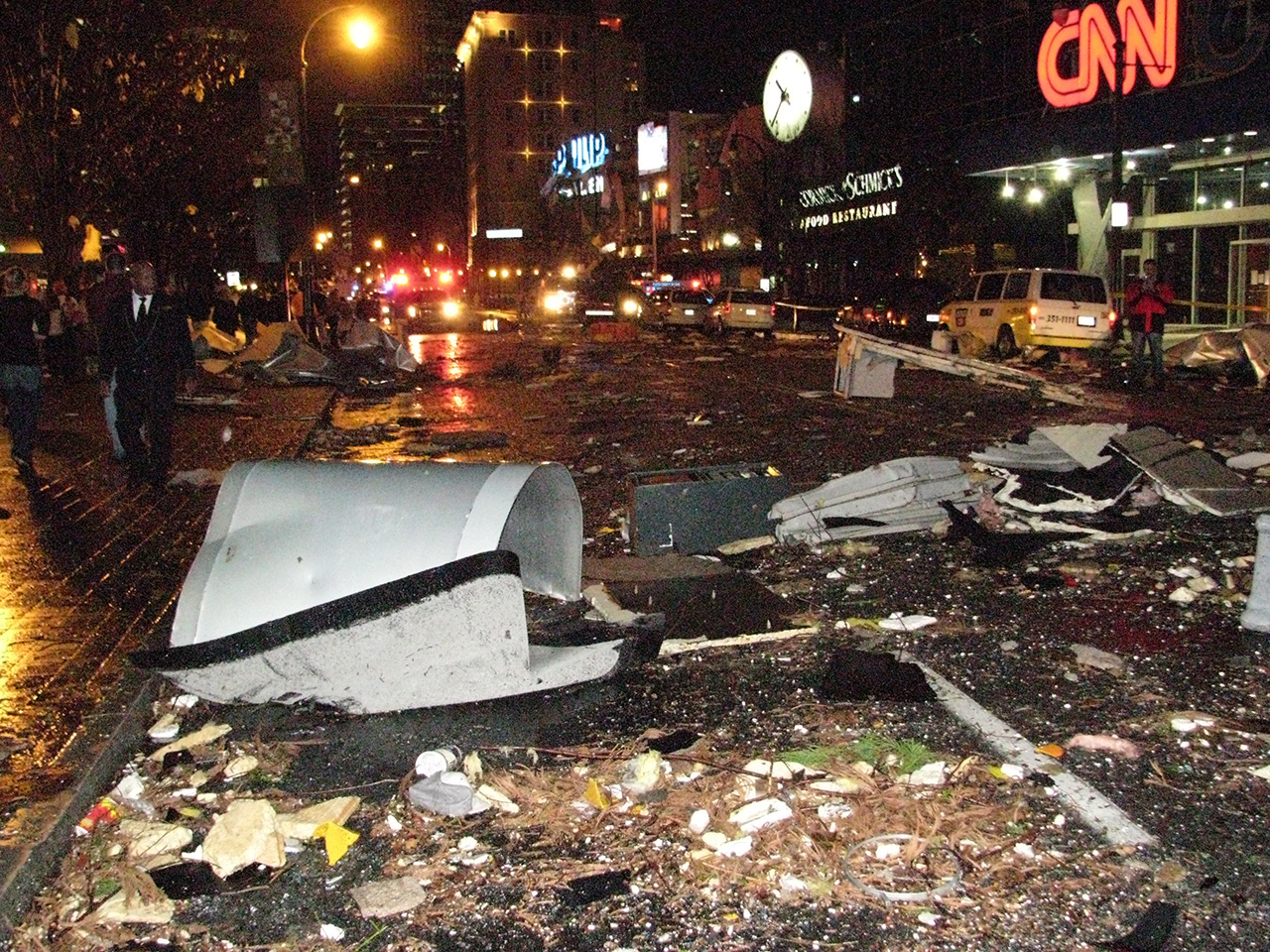
Tornado damage on Marietta Street in front of CNN Center / Omni Hotel

Twenty-seven people were treated for injuries. In addition, over 20 homes were completely destroyed.

All of CNN's TV networks remained on the air, but the glass roof of the CNN Center atrium was damaged, flooding part of the food court. Additionally, blown-out windows in the ground-floor CNN.com newsroom and the fourth-floor videotape library caused minor damage. Live news coverage of the aftermath was carried on CNN International, in turn simulcast domestically on CNN until 1 am EDT. CNN resumed broadcasting from their main newsroom at 6 am EDT, showing several parts of the newsroom with computer stations covered with tarps, the damaged atrium of CNN Center, and staff using trash cans and buckets to collect dripping rainwater to the right of the anchor desk due to the damaged roof. When more storms moved in later in the day, the network was forced to move all Atlanta on-camera operations to the windowless CNN-I studio, while taped programming was shown for most of the day.

The city received emergency assistance from the Georgia Emergency Management Agency (GEMA), Highway Emergency Response Operators (HEROs), Fulton and DeKalb counties (where Atlanta is situated), and surrounding cities and counties. Atlanta Mayor Shirley Franklin also declared a state of emergency for the city and Governor Sonny Perdue issued a state state of emergency declaration for Atlanta enabling the city to seek disaster aid from the Federal Emergency Management Agency (FEMA). President Bush declared a major disaster on March 20.

At the time, it was the most expensive tornado in Atlanta history, in raw U.S. dollars, after the 1999 Bridge Creek-Moore tornado, which cost half a billion dollars.

=== Bartow County, Georgia ===
Bartow County, Georgia
Meteorological history
- Date: March 15, 2008
- Formed: March 15, 2008, 11:20 p.m. EDT (UTC−04:00)
- Dissipated: March 15, 2008, 11:32 p.m. EDT (UTC−04:00)
- Duration: 12 minutes

EF3 tornado
- on the Enhanced Fujita scale
- Highest winds: 150 mph (240 km/h)

Overall effects
- Fatalities: 2
- Injuries: 2
- Damage: $7,500,000 (2008 United States Dollar)
- Areas affected: Polk County, Georgia Floyd County, Georgia Bartow County, Georgia

On March 15, this intense and destructive EF3 tornado tore across Bartow County, & Floyd County, Georgia. At 11:20 AM EDT, the Polk county sheriff department spotted a funnel cloud in northern Polk County. The funnel then touched down north of Seney, Georgia. It caused minor to moderate damage before strengthening to EF2 intensity. It remained mostly over rural forests, but then strengthening to EF3 intensity. It damaged a metal building system on Live Oak road, which a National Weather Service ground & aerial damage survey team would assign it an EF3 rating with wind speeds up to 150 mph. It caused intense roof damage to a home on Bon Loop road, which was outside of the EF3 intensity core. One fatality and one injury were at this location. Still sustaining EF3 winds, it swelled to half a mile wide. It began shrinking in diameter, but then briefly strengthening and causing all walls to cave in onto a poorly built home on Old Wax Road, where one woman was killed, and a man in the same home was seriously injured. The man would be sent to a hospital in Rome, Georgia.It went over rural forests, weakening to EF2 intensity, although still causing intense damage to trees. It moved just south of Old Alabama road, weakening further into EF1 intensity. Homes along Old Alabama road would receive moderate damage to roofs and windows. The tornado was now a mile and a half north of Taylorsville, Georgia. It would move east, causing weak damage to forests and homes, but on Shiloh Church road, it rapidly intensified back to EF3 intensity. One home along Old Stilesboro road would be flattened, although homes next to it would have relatively minor damage. 500 yards northeast of this home, an electrical line collapsed. It impacted a power plant near this location. It then weakened back to EF2 intensity over forests. The Taylorsville elementary school would receive notable damage. Multiple homes on Popum road had significant roof damage. Multiple trees on Euharlee road were toppled over. Woodland high school had severe damage inflicted. It sustained EF2 winds for the next few miles before passing south of Valley Oak Acres, Georgia. It then slowly continued weakening before roping out 1 mile northwest of Parkerosa, Georgia at 11:32 EDT.

== See also ==
- List of North American tornadoes and tornado outbreaks
- List of tornadoes striking downtown areas
