= 2008 Atlanta tornado =

Tornado in the United States

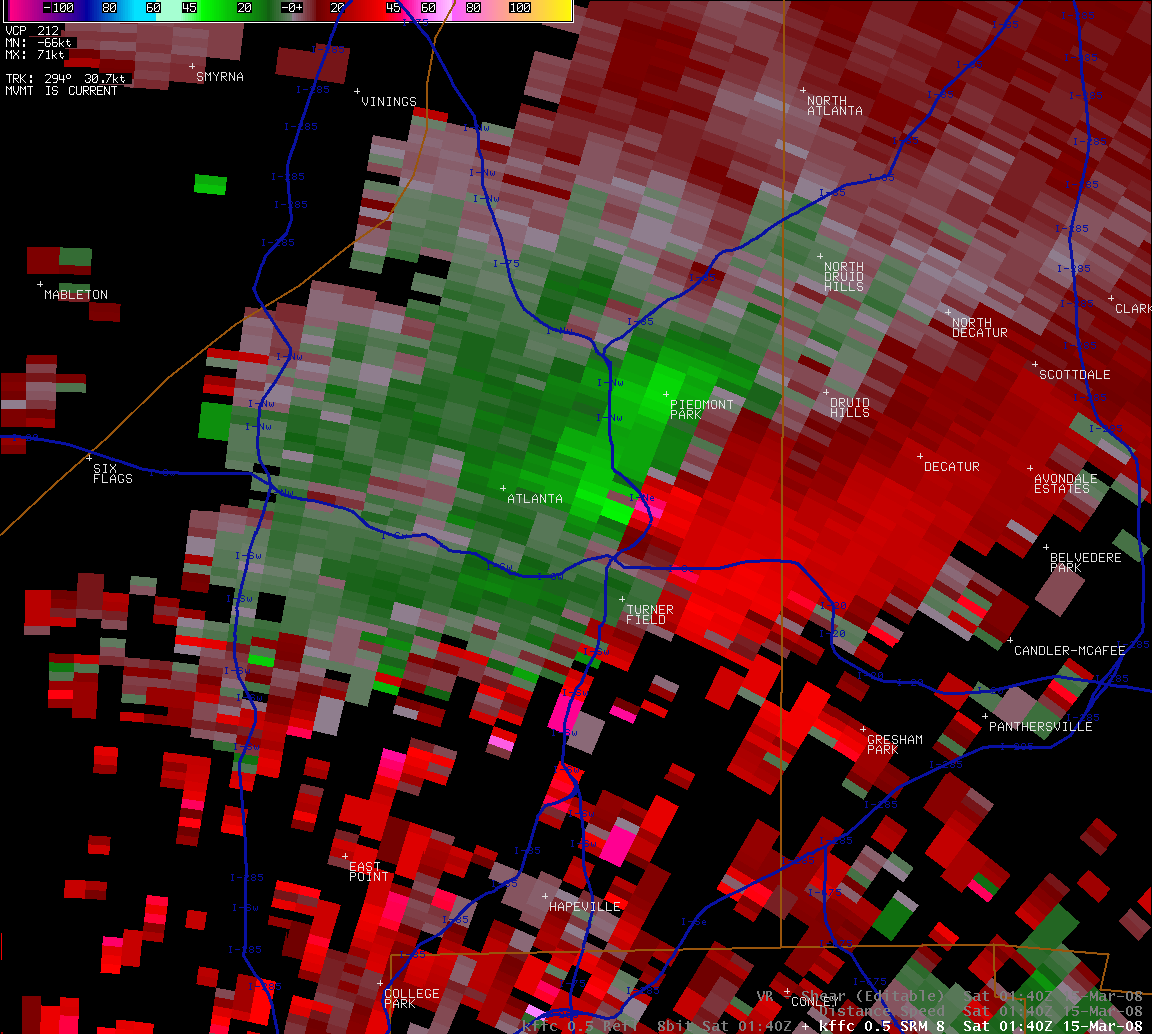
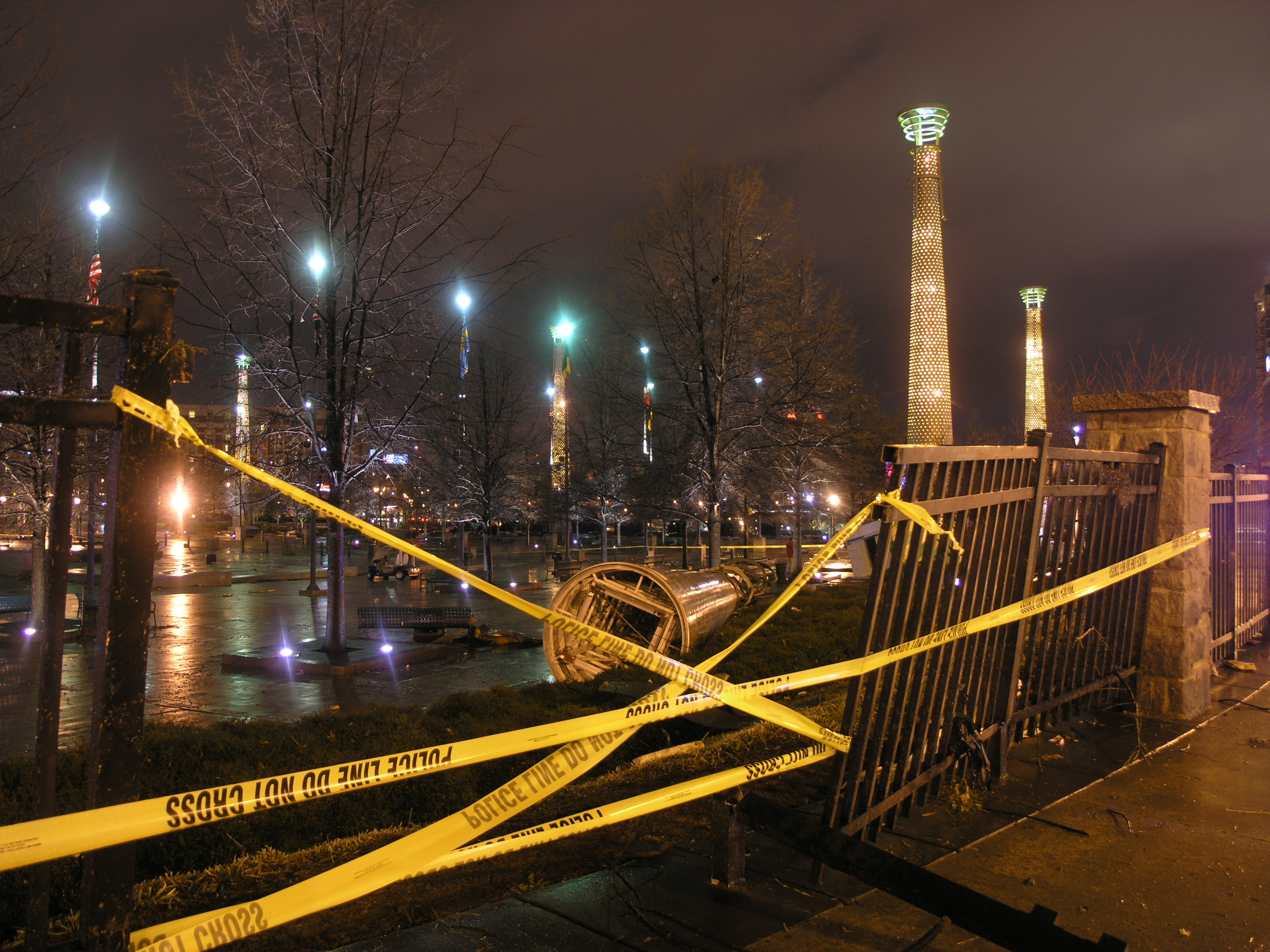
- Clockwise from Top: The tornado (dark left cloud) illuminated by lightning in Atlanta; Damage to Centennial Olympic Park from the tornado; A Next-Generation Radar scan of the tornado

Meteorological history
- Formed: March 14, 2008; 9:38 p.m. EDT (UTC–04:00)
- Dissipated: March 14, 2008; 9:50 p.m. EDT (UTC-04:00)
- Duration: 12 minutes

EF2 tornado
- on the Enhanced Fujita scale
- Max width: 200 yards (0.11 mi; 0.18 km)
- Path length: 6.25 miles (10.06 km)
- Highest winds: 130 mph (210 km/h)

Overall effects
- Fatalities: 1
- Injuries: 30
- Damage: $500 million (2008 USD)
- Areas affected: Downtown Atlanta, specifically Fulton and DeKalb counties, Georgia, United States
- Power outages: 19,000
- Houses destroyed: 50
- Part of the Tornado outbreak of March 14–15, 2008 and Tornadoes of 2008

In the evening hours of March 14, 2008, a strong and damaging EF2 tornado tracked across downtown Atlanta, Georgia, killing one person and injuring thirty others. It traveled 6.25 miles (10.06 km) across its twelve-minute lifespan, from 9:38 p.m. to 9:50 p.m. EDT. The tornado was one of many tornadoes on March 14–15, 2008. The tornado was formed from an isolated supercell thunderstorm, though conditions were not ideal for severe thunderstorms that night.

== Meteorological synopsis ==
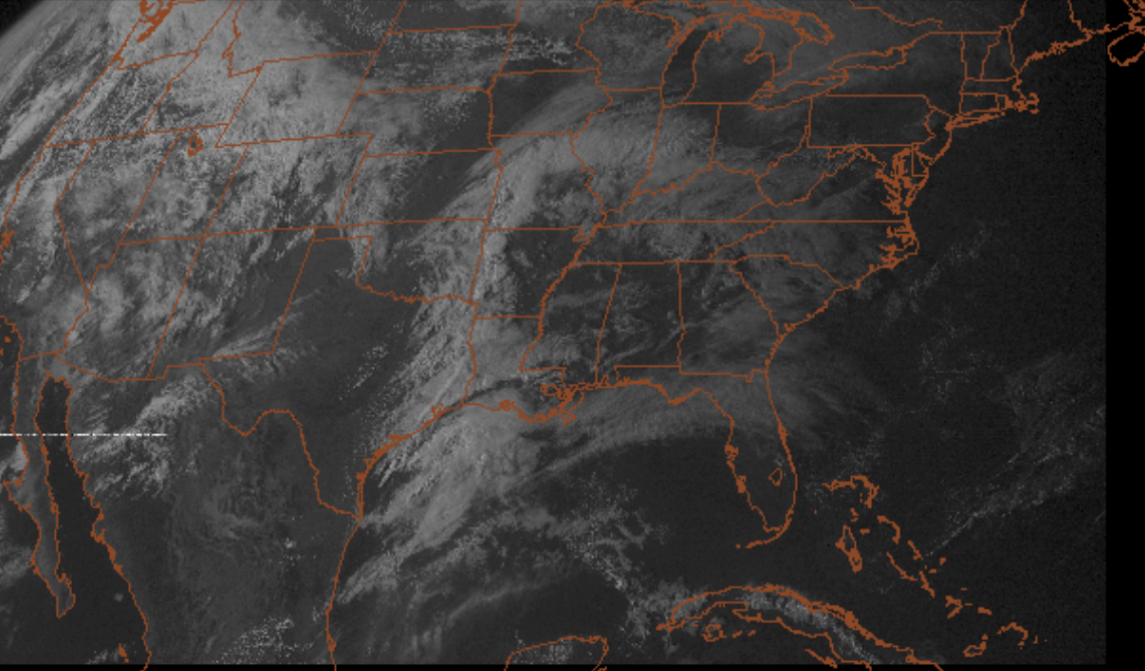
Satellite imagery of the storm system that produced the tornado

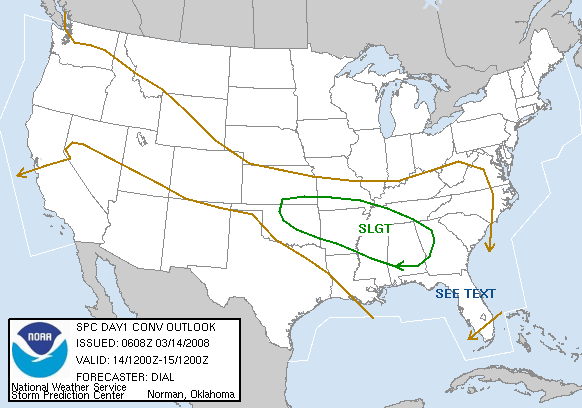
The Storm Prediction Center outlook for March 14, 2008

=== Storm Prediction Center outlook ===
The Storm Prediction Center (SPC) issued a slight risk for severe weather Atlanta during their 9:00 p.m. EDT outlook. The Storm Prediction Center highlighted a two percent chance of tornadoes for the Atlanta area. Although a watch was considered, no tornado watches were issued for the Atlanta area because of the low probabilities of any tornadoes occurring. Hail was the biggest severe thunderstorm threat that night.

=== Synoptics ===
Unlike most supercell thunderstorms, the tornado moved southeast instead of the typical northeast trajectory. Wind shear remained at 20 knot (23 mph, 37 km/h). Temperatures remained around 57°F(14°C). Dew points were 60°F (15°C). Moderate instability up to 875 J/kg were present at the mixed layer. Surface layer CAPE was up to 1,300 J/kg. 3CAPE reached up to 115 J/kg. Relative helicity values were up to 150 m^{2}/s^{2}. All of these factors made the Storm Prediction Center issue a slight risk of severe weather along with a 2% risk of tornadoes.

=== Storm intensification ===
The storm that later produced the Atlanta tornado intensified in an unusual environment. Georgia had been in a drought, which made the ground very hot and dry. A few days before the Atlanta storm, multiple rain showers had hit Metro Atlanta, giving the formerly dry areas, ample moisture. This allowed for the storm to absorb warm, dry air, then moving over moisture rich zones, giving the storm even more moisture. Atlanta's infrastructure fueled the storm even further. Windows, concrete, and metals released heat, creating a "heat island" over Atlanta.

== Tornado summary ==
=== Formation ===
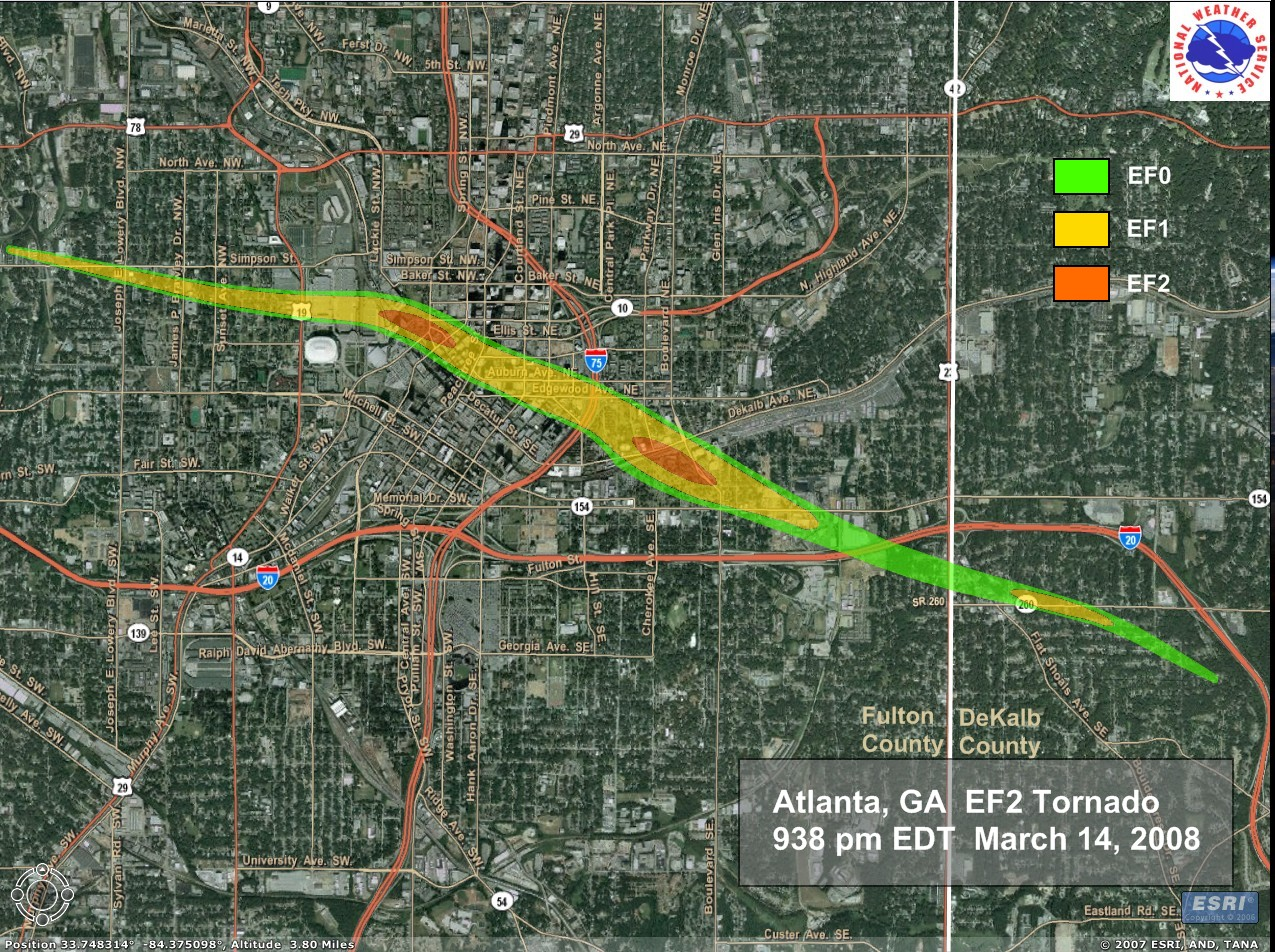
Map of the path taken by the Atlanta tornado

At 9:38 PM EDT, the tornado touched down on Joseph E. Boone Boulevard at EF0 intensity. It continued doing minor damage for the next one hundred twenty yards. Still on the same road, it intensified to EF1 wind speeds. It crossed Mayson Turner Road at EF1 intensity. On Joseph E. Lowery Boulevard, the tornado increased to 120 yd (360 ft) in width, although it still sustained EF1 level wind speeds in its core.

=== Downtown Atlanta ===
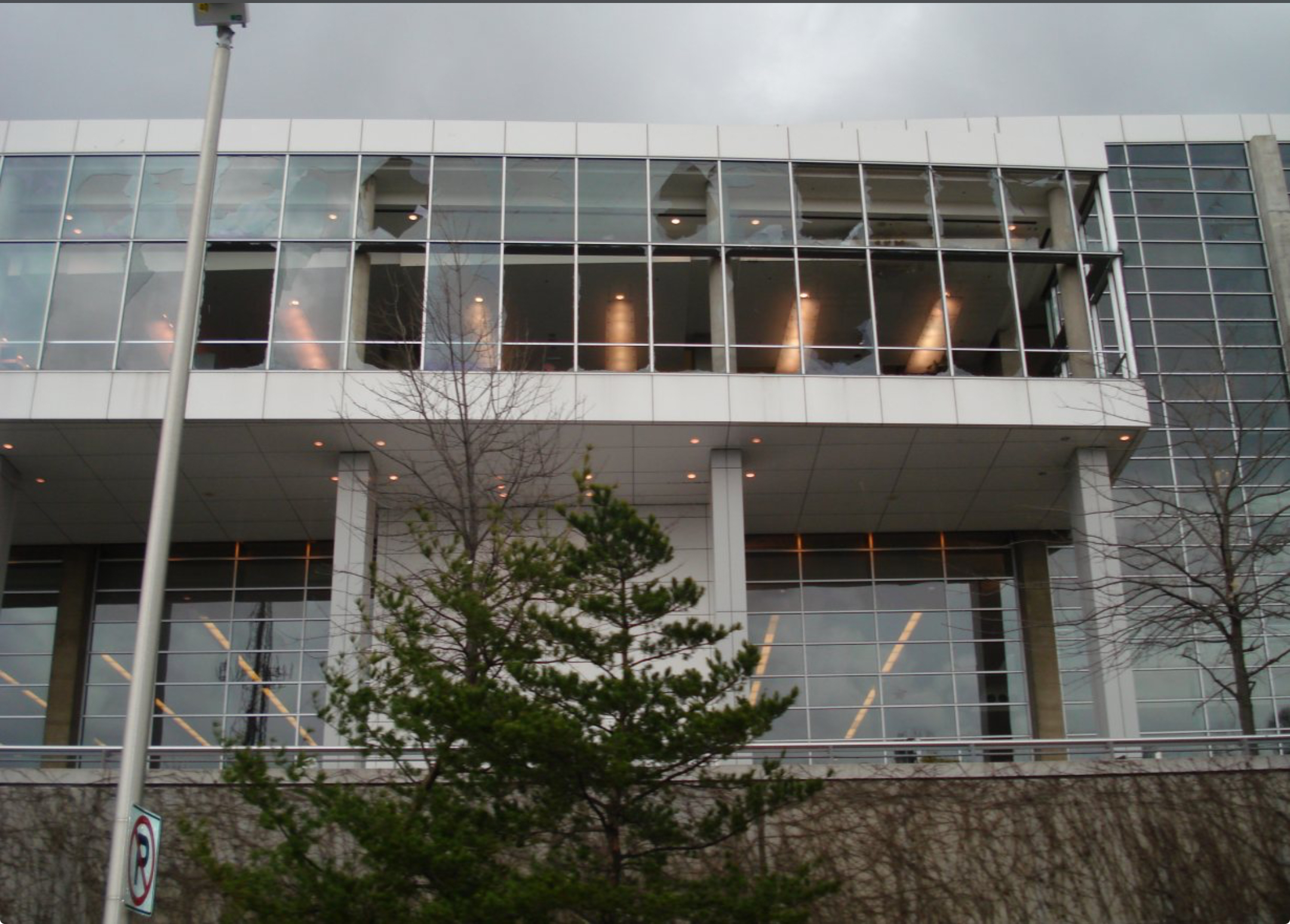
Georgia World Congress Center damage from the Atlanta tornado.

While expanding in width, it moved across Pond Street. It crossed Maple Street while traveling southeast. Just after Maple Street. Right after crossing Northside Drive. The tornado then impacted the Georgia World Congress Center, sustaining EF1 level damage. Right after impacting the Georgia World Congress Center, the tornado began causing EF2 level damage. The tornado crossed over Centennial Olympic Park. While it was damaging Centennial Olympic Park, the CNN Center was impacted, sustaining EF1 damage as multiple windows were blown out at the center and the nearby Omni Hotel. The tornado dodged the Georgia Dome to the north by 100 yd (300 ft) while a game was ongoing. Basketball player Mykal Riley scored a point, sending the game into overtime. At the dome, there was no warning of the oncoming tornado. Catwalks started swaying and insulation fell onto players and the crowd. The tornado weakened to EF1 intensity as it crossed Fairlie Street, moving southeast at that intensity. The Westin Peachtree Plaza Hotel was subjected to 100 mph (160 km/h) winds, causing numerous windows to be blown out. The tornado would sustain EF1 intensity. It would eventually cross Interstate 75. Right before it could move across William Holmes Borders Drive, it would restrengthen back to EF2 intensity.

=== Cabbagetown and dissipation ===
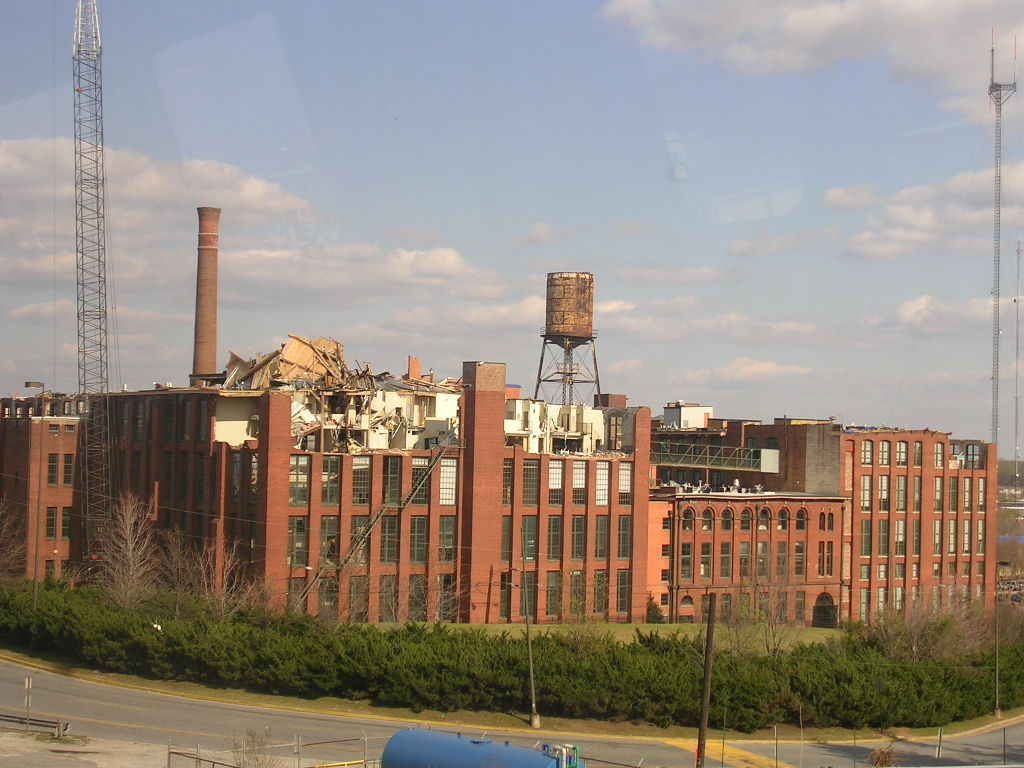
Fulton Bag and the Cotton Mill Lofts. Photo taken on a moving train.

The tornado was now near Cabbagetown, Atlanta. The tornado ripped off a roof to a home along Jackson Street. That specific home was subjected to 120 mph (190 km/h) winds. On March 22, a man named Gregory Lee Sr. was found dead due to blunt force injuries from a brick and stucco wall collapsing onto him when he was in the parking lot of a low rise building along Decatur Street. A building named the Cotton Mill Lofts, had a complete top story collapse in the 130 mph (210 km/h) winds. The tornado had sustained EF2 wind speeds until Carroll Street. It weakened back to a maximum of EF1 wind speeds. It would continue to shrink then briefly widening on Gaskill Street. After crossing over Pearl Street, and right before impacting Chester Avenue, it would weaken to EF0 intensity. Still at EF0 intensity, it would cross Interstate 20. Once it reached Patterson Avenue, it briefly intensified back to EF1 wind speeds until weakening again. At Atlanta fire station #13, a gust of wind would be measured at 83 mph. At Atlanta fire station #4, a 65 mph (105 km/h) wind gust occurred. It began rapidly shrinking in diameter until it dissipated at 9:50 p.m. EDT.

== Aftermath ==
=== Response ===
14 exit roads on Interstate 75 and Interstate 85 were blocked by the government. 200 firefighters and 150 policemen closed multiple streets near the CNN Center because of broken glass and debris being scattered across the roads and they were worried glass would rain down on the road. The Saint Patrick's Day celebration was canceled due to the tornado. Over fifty search and rescue members were deployed to the Cotton Mill Lofts. The National Weather Service began to snap photos of the damage. The National Weather Service would work with the Fulton County EMA to document and take photos of the damage. At 2:35 p.m. EDT, a state of emergency would be issued by Governor Sonny Perdue. The American Red Cross set up a shelter for displaced people. Georgia Emergency Management Agency deployed six search and rescue teams to look for civilians in collapsed buildings. The Georgia State Patrol, Georgia Department of Agriculture, Georgia Department of Defense, and Georgia Department of Transportation all assisted in the rebuilding of Atlanta. Around 80 people would go to the American Red Cross shelter, 50 of them being elderly. Grady Memorial Hospital had multiple windows shattered, but it would continue operating as normal. Remaining basketball games would be relocated to Georgia Tech's gym. Due to not having enough space, many fans could not attend the remaining basketball games. People were advised to stay indoors unless checking on family and property. Sections of the Metropolitan Atlanta Rapid Transit Authority (MARTA) was shut down. By the end of Saturday, 10,000 were still without power. On March 16, neighboring counties helped with the repair of traffic lights to. On March 17, multiple roads in downtown Atlanta remained closed. The Salvation Army had 1,000 meals ready to be given to those devastated by the storm. On March 20, president George W. Bush issued a presidential state of emergency. In all, the tornado would cause $500 million (2008 USD).

==== FEMA response ====
By April 10, 2008, FEMA counted how many residents had applied for disaster assistance. The total was 1,387 civilians. 287 civilians received $1 million (2008 USD) under the Individuals and Households program. $645,000 (2008 USD) was given to over 260 homeowners of the 287 civilians under FEMA's housing assistance program. 119 others would receive $181,000 via FEMA's other needs assistance program. In Fulton County, a disaster loan outreach center (DLOC) was opened for residents of Atlanta. The center would close on April 6, 2008.

=== Damage ===
19,000 people were left without power. Billboards were found collapsed on top of vehicles. Roads were unusable due to traffic lights being swept away. The basketball game at the Georgia Dome was delayed for 1 hour because of the tornado crossing extremely close to the dome. "It sounded like fans were banging on their seats or stomping their feet, but it kept up and got a lot louder, then the ceiling of the dome started waving, the giant TV screens were waving, and light fixtures and dust started falling". Metal, insulation, and debris were found all across downtown Atlanta. Two Olympic torches at the Centennial Olympic Park were toppled. Cleanup crews were moving downed trees and limbs, which still remained on the roads along with many dumpsters. It would take 1,100 workers to repair the Georgia World Congress Center. The tornado damaged 370,000 square feet of ceiling tiles, 725,000 square feet of roofing pieces, and 100,000 square feet of structures. Damage at the Georgia World Congress Center was over $80,000,000 (2008 USD). The Fulton Bag and Cotton Mills Lofts building was heavily damaged. The five story building had its roof ripped off. In addition to roof damage, some exterior walls were blown away. Pieces of the fourth and fifth floor collapsed. The collapse reached to the basement of the loft. A dog was found under a pile of collapsed bricks. The dog survived. Damage at the Cotton Mill Lofts reached $18,000,000 (2008 USD).

==== CNN Center and Omni Hotel ====
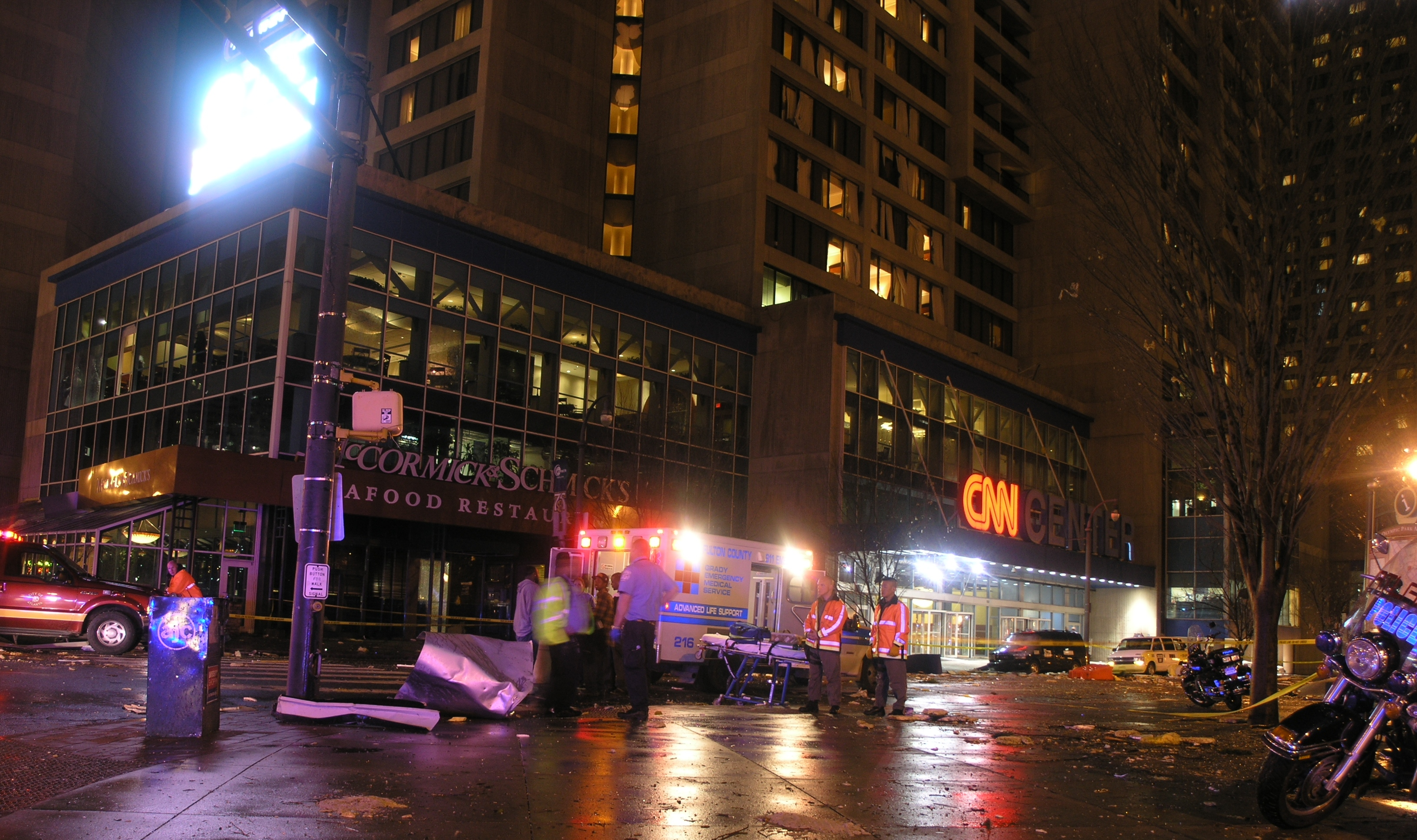
Debris and an ambulance surrounding the CNN Center.

Reconstruction of the Omni Hotel began on March 20, 2008. The bridge connecting the Omni Hotel and the CNN Center was boarded up. 170 rooms on the south tower received broken windows, while the north tower only had 8 shattered windows. At the CNN Center, over 1,600 windows were shattered. CNN National Newsroom was forced to relocate to the CNNi newsroom.A damaged water line caused water to flood into the atrium of the CNN Center. It took 7 months to get all windows at the Omni repaired.

==== Westin Peachtree Plaza Hotel ====
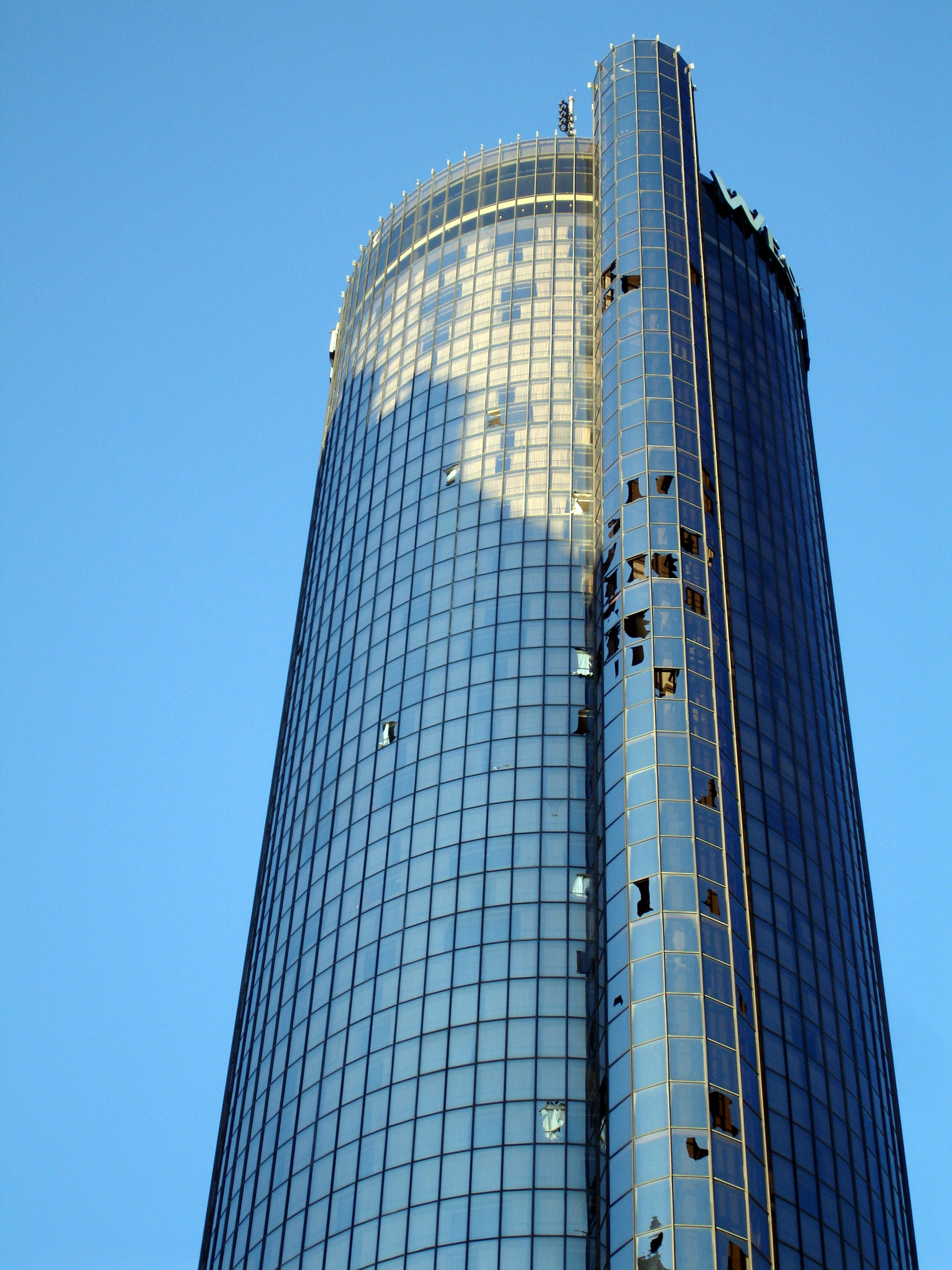
Damage to the Westin.

Over 320 rooms at the Westin Peachtree Plaza Hotel were made uninhabitable by the tornado. 239 of those rooms had at least one window shattered. Over 600 tons of glass was recycled during the rebuilding of the Westin. The company that manufactured the windows for the Westin no longer manufacture them, which made finding window panes difficult. New windows looked mismatched compared to the windows that had survived the storm because of weathering on the older panes. Every window cost up to $4,000 (2008 USD). Window codes had changed by the time of the tornado, further complicating reconstruction. There were no major injuries and fatalities when the tornado struck.

== In popular culture ==
=== Films ===
On March 3, 2012, a film named Miracle 3 released. It is a part of a film series named SEC Storied. Miracle 3 was directed by Rory Karpf. The film explores the potentially disastrous event at the SEC tournament at the Georgia Dome. It shows multiple interviews from various people that were present at the dome when Mykal Riley scored a three-pointer shot during the tornado.

== See also ==
- List of tornadoes striking downtown areas of large cities
- 2011 Tuscaloosa–Birmingham tornado – a devastating EF4 multiple-vortex tornado in Alabama that also hit large metropolitan areas
- 1997 Miami tornado – an F1 tornado in Florida that impacted a major city 11 years prior to this tornado
- Jarrell tornado – a catastrophic F5 tornado in Texas that also took an unusual path
