= T. J. Johnson (American football) =

American football player (born 1990)

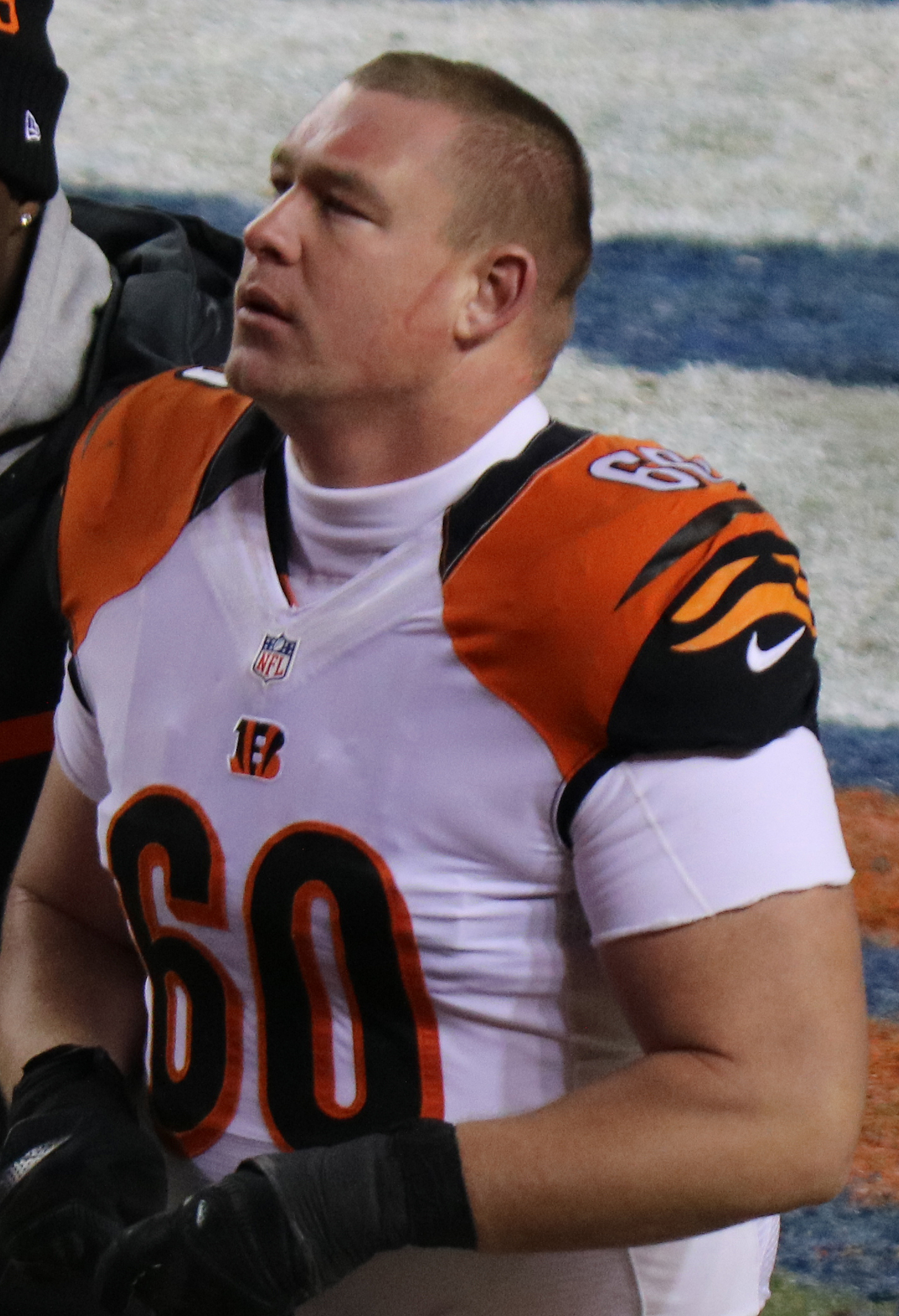
- Johnson with the Cincinnati Bengals in 2015

No. 60
- Position: Center

Personal information
- Born: July 17, 1990 (age 36); Aynor, South Carolina, U.S.
- Listed height: 6 ft 4 in (1.93 m)
- Listed weight: 310 lb (141 kg)

Career information
- High school: Aynor
- College: South Carolina
- NFL draft: 2013: 7th round, 251st overall pick

Career history
- Cincinnati Bengals (2013–2017)

Awards and highlights
- Second-team All-SEC (2012)

Career NFL statistics
- Games played: 45
- Games started: 5
- Stats at Pro Football Reference

Anthony Eugene Johnson (born July 17, 1990) is an American former professional football player who was a center for the Cincinnati Bengals of the National Football League (NFL). He was selected by the Bengals in the seventh round of the 2013 NFL draft after playing college football for the South Carolina Gamecocks.

== Early life ==
Johnson played high school football at Aynor High School in Aynor, South Carolina. He was named first-team all-state was by the Associated Press his senior year. He played in the 71st-annual Shrine Bowl of the Carolinas and was named to the All-Atlantic Region team by PrepStar magazine.

== College career ==
Johnson played for the Gamecocks at the University of South Carolina from 2009 to 2012. He was redshirted in 2008. He earned Freshman All-SEC honors in 2009. He was selected to the second-team on Phil Steele's 2012 Midseason All-America and All-SEC teams. He was a member of the SEC Fall Academic Honor Roll. Johnson started a school record 53 games over his four seasons at the University of South Carolina. He played in the East–West Shrine Game following his senior season.

== Professional career ==
Johnson was selected by the Cincinnati Bengals with the 251st pick in the 2013 NFL draft. He signed with the Bengals on May 8, 2013. He was released by the Bengals on August 31 and signed to the team's practice squad on September 1. He was signed to a futures contract by the Bengals on January 6, 2014. He made his NFL debut on September 21, 2014 against the Tennessee Titans.

On March 7, 2017, the Bengals extended a restricted free agent tender on Johnson. On March 17, 2017, Johnson signed a two-year contract with the Bengals. He played in 13 games with four starts at right guard before suffering a pectoral injury. He was placed on injured reserve on December 16, 2017.

On September 1, 2018, Johnson was released by the Bengals.
