= Dawsey =

Dawsey is a surname. Notable people with the surname include:

- Josh Dawsey, American journalist
- Lawrence Dawsey (born 1967), American football player
- Tony Dawsey, American mastering engineer
