= Aynor High School =

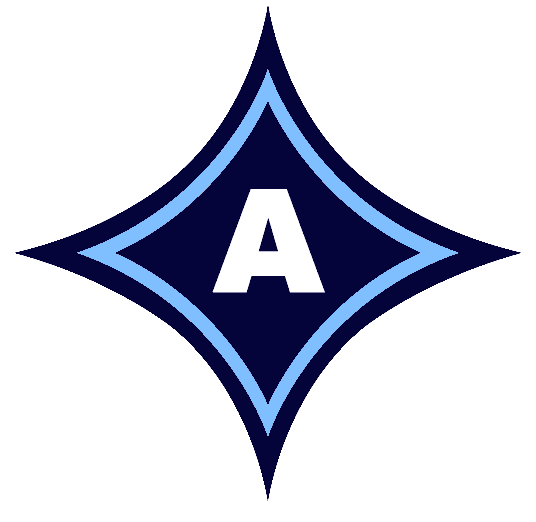

Location
- 201 Jordanville Road; Aynor, South Carolina 29511; United States
- 33°59′28″N 79°12′13″W

Information
- Other name: AHS
- Type: Public high school
- School district: Horry County Schools
- NCES School ID: 450249000645
- Principal: Michael McCracken
- Teaching staff: 52.00 (on an FTE basis)
- Grades: 9–12
- Enrollment: 878 (2023-2024)
- Student to teacher ratio: 16.88
- Colors: Navy blue, columbia blue, white
- Mascot: Blue Jacket
- Nickname: Blue Jackets
- Yearbook: The Hive
- Website: www.horrycountyschools.net/Aynor_High_School

Aynor High School (AHS) is a public high school in Aynor, South Carolina, United States. It is part of the Horry County Schools district and is an International Baccalaureate school.

== Notable alumni ==
- Josh Dawsey (born 1989 or 1990), journalist
- T. J. Johnson, NFL player
