= Atlanta Rolling Mill =

Former rolling mill in Atlanta, Georgia

Coordinates: 33.751°N 84.369°W

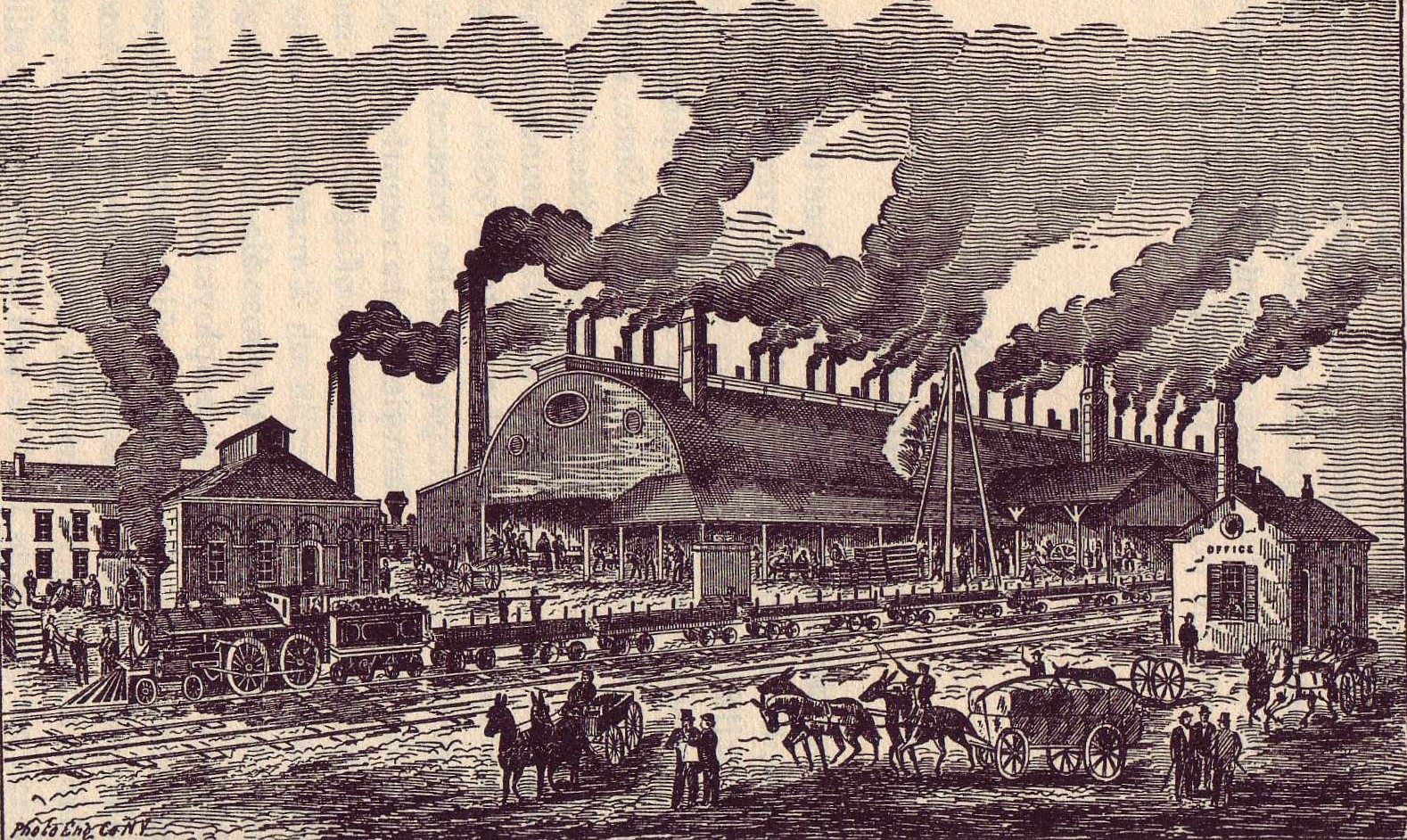
The Antebellum Atlanta Rolling Mill

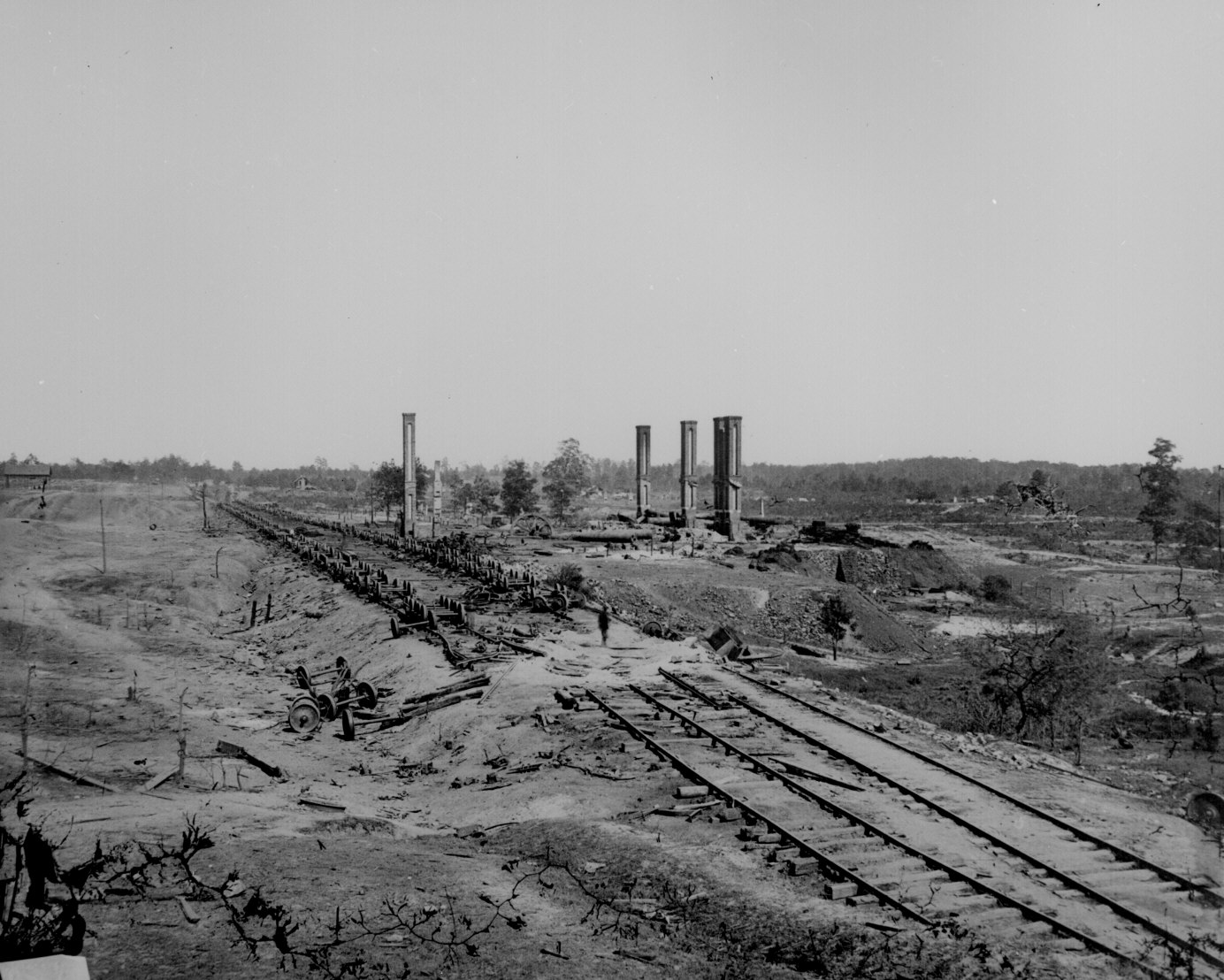
Rolling mill from the west after its destruction

The Atlanta Rolling Mill (later the Confederate Rolling Mill) was constructed in 1858 by Lewis Schofield and James Blake and soon after, Schofield and William Markham took it over and transformed it into the South's second most productive rolling mill, after the Tredegar Iron Works in Richmond, Virginia.

Their specialty was re-rolling worn out railroad rails but during the American Civil War it also rolled out cannon, iron rail, and 2-inch-thick (51 mm) sheets of iron to clad the CSS Virginia for the Confederate navy.

It was bought out by Charleston, SC interests in 1863 and became known as the Confederate Rolling Mill when it produced the former products as well as cannon.

Shortly after midnight on September 1, 1864, cavalrymen under the command of the retreating Confederate General J.B. Hood set fire to 81 ammunition train cars parked outside the mill to prevent them from being acquired by General Sherman. The ensuing explosions destroyed the mill and destroyed or greatly damaged structures within 1/4 mile. The events were so loud that Sherman himself heard the explosions from approximately 23 miles away at Lovejoy's Station.

Part of what is now Boulevard was named Rolling Mill Street, when the street was extended north of the railroad in the late 1860s, thus commemorating the already destroyed mill. The name was changed to Boulevard around 1880.

It was located on the current site of the Fulton Bag and Cotton Mill (now residential lofts) in Cabbagetown on the south side of the Georgia Railroad just east of Oakland Cemetery.
