= 2024: How Trump Retook the White House and the Democrats Lost America =

2025 political non-fiction book

- Author: Josh Dawsey, Tyler Pager, Isaac Arnsdorf
- Publisher: Penguin Books
- Publication date: July 8, 2025
- Pages: 416
- ISBN: 9781776951277

2024: How Trump Retook the White House and the Democrats Lost America is a 2025 non-fiction book by Josh Dawsey, Tyler Pager, and Isaac Arnsdorf that was published by Penguin Books. It details the 2024 United States presidential campaigns of Donald Trump, Joe Biden, and Kamala Harris. It is based on over 300 interviews conducted over 18 months. It was released on July 8, 2025 to generally positive reception.
