= Cabbagetown, Atlanta =

- Cabbagetown District
- U.S. National Register of Historic Places
- U.S. Historic district
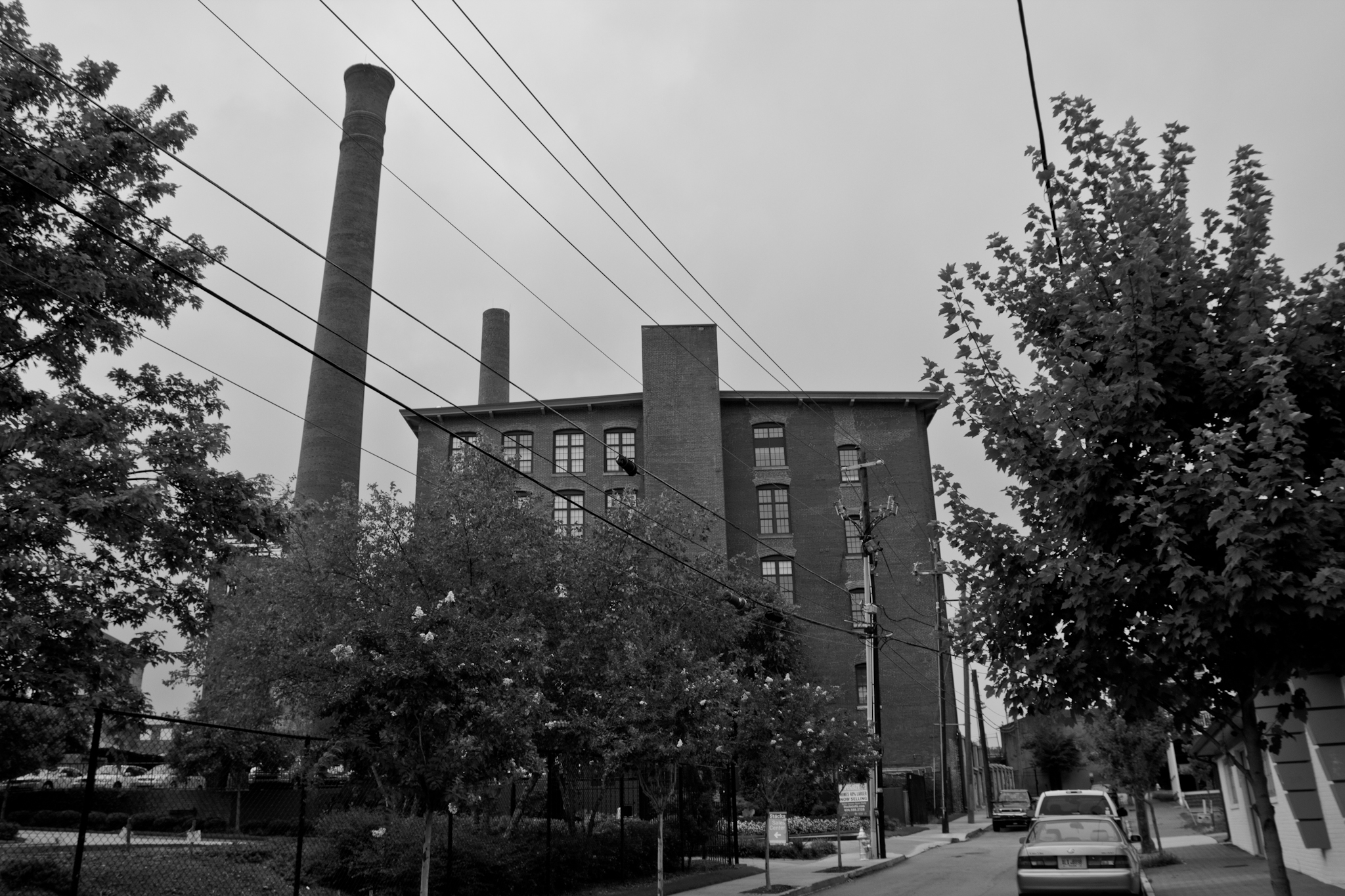
- The view of the Cotton Mill Lofts from Carroll Street in Cabbagetown

- Location within Atlanta Location within Georgia Location within the United States
- Location: Atlanta, Georgia
- Coordinates: 33°44′59″N 84°21′59″W
- Built: 1881
- Architectural style: Bungalow/Craftsman, Late Victorian, Romanesque
- NRHP reference No.: 76000623
- Added to NRHP: January 1, 1976

Cabbagetown (/kʌˈbɑːdʒtʌn/) is an intown neighborhood on the east side of Atlanta, Georgia, United States, abutting historic Oakland Cemetery. It includes the Cabbagetown District, a historic district listed on the U.S. National Register of Historic Places.

== History ==
The Atlanta Rolling Mill was destroyed after the Battle of Atlanta and on its site the Fulton Bag and Cotton Mill began operations in 1881. Cabbagetown was built as the surrounding mill town and was one of the first textile processing mills built in the south. Its primary product was cotton bags for packaging agricultural products. Built during a period when many industries were relocating to the post-Reconstruction South in search of cheap labor, it opened shortly following the International Cotton Exposition, which was held in Atlanta in an effort to attract investment to the region. The mill was owned and operated by Jacob Elsas, a German Jewish immigrant. Its work force consisted of poor whites recruited from the Appalachian region of north Georgia. Elsas built a small community of one and two-story shotgun houses and cottage-style houses surrounding the mill, originally known as Factory Town or Fulton Mill Village. Like most mill towns, the streets are extremely narrow with short blocks and many intersections.

There are a few explanations as to how the neighborhood received its current name. One is that the mostly transplanted poor Appalachian residents, largely of Scots-Irish descent, who worked in the nearby Fulton Bag and Cotton Mill would grow cabbages in the front yards of their houses, so that one could distinctly smell the odor of cooking cabbage coming from the neighborhood. This term was used originally with derision by people outside the neighborhood, but it soon became a label of pride for the people who lived there. A variation of this legend is that a Ford Model T took a sharp turn at one of the main intersections of Cabbagetown, overturned, and spilled its cargo of cabbages on the street. Yet another story involves a neighborhood baseball team. Atlanta History Center documents show references to the name Pearl Park, after the daughter of a developer who built houses directly to the east of the mill houses near modern-day Pearl Street.

The mill, at its height, employed 2,600 people. A protracted strike in 1914-15 failed to unionize the factory's workforce. For over half a century, Cabbagetown remained home to a tight-knit, homogenous, and semi-isolated community of people whose lives were anchored by the mill, until it closed in 1977. While the mill itself was named to the National Register of Historic Places in 1976, the surrounding neighborhood went into a steep decline following the mill closure.

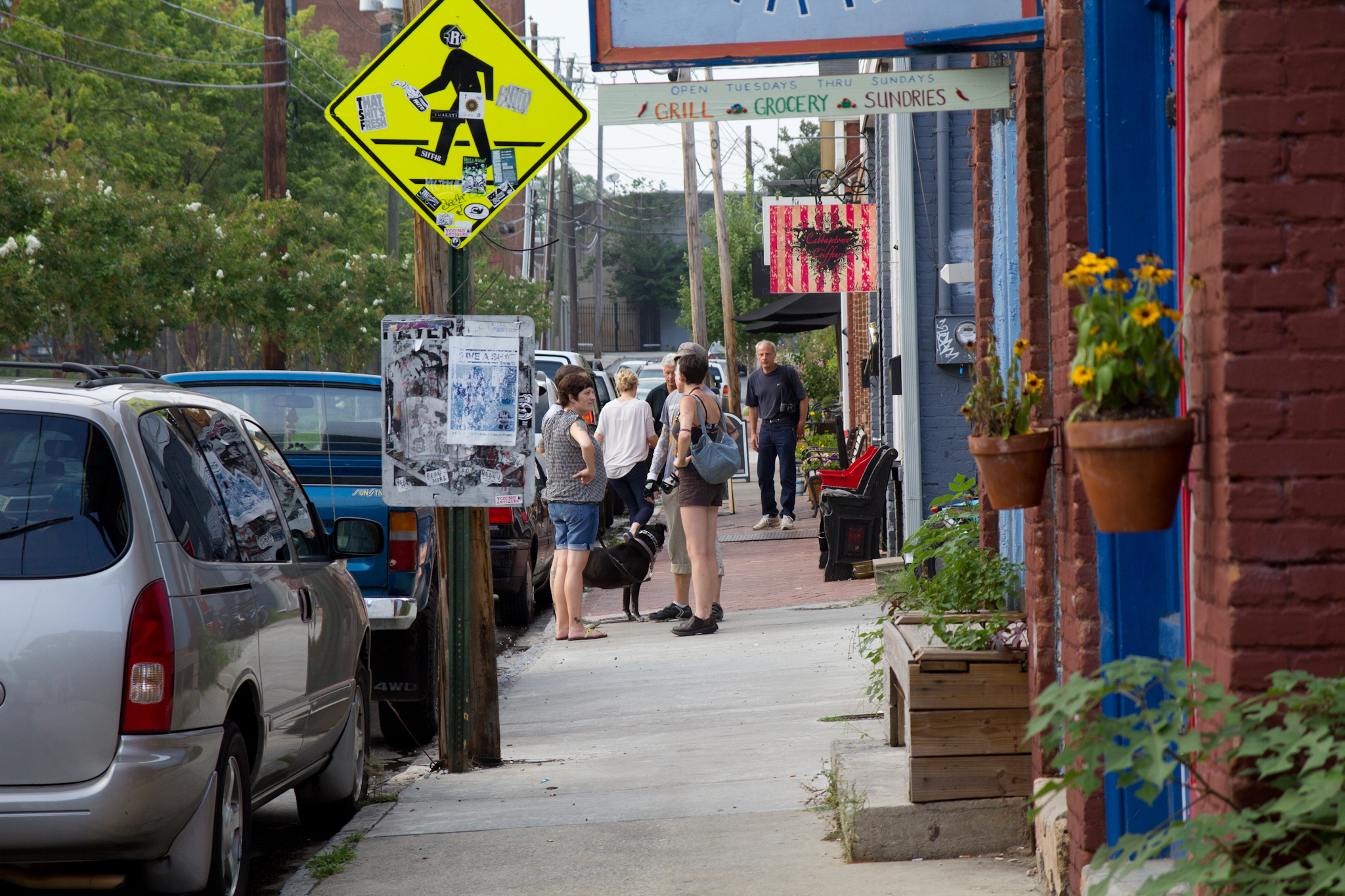
Street scene in Cabbagetown

Accompanying the initialization of Atlanta's intown renaissance in the early 1990s, Cabbagetown underwent tremendous growth. As with many other east side neighborhoods, revitalization was sparked by an influx of artists in the 1980s, including Panorama Ray, who operated a photo gallery on the main drag, Carroll Street. Since his death in 1997, Carroll Street has become the home of popular restaurants and serves as a neighborhood gathering spot.

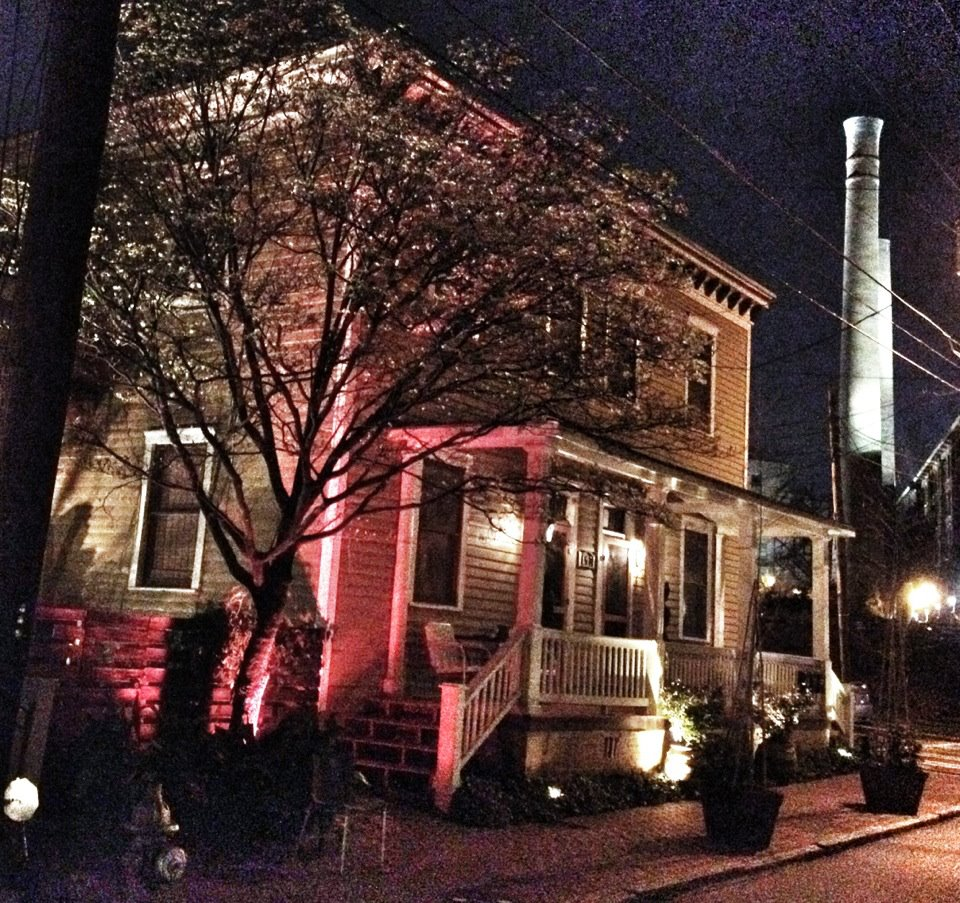
Carroll Street at night, with smokestack of Fulton Bag and Cotton Mill in background

Beginning in 1996, the mill itself was renovated as the Fulton Cotton Mill Lofts, which the developer described as "the nation's largest residential loft community". In April 1999, a five-alarm fire severely damaged the east building which was still being renovated and several nearby homes were destroyed. The lofts nevertheless opened the following year. However, a tornado in March 2008 damaged parts of the loft complex and many of the historic homes and businesses in Cabbagetown.

== Culture ==
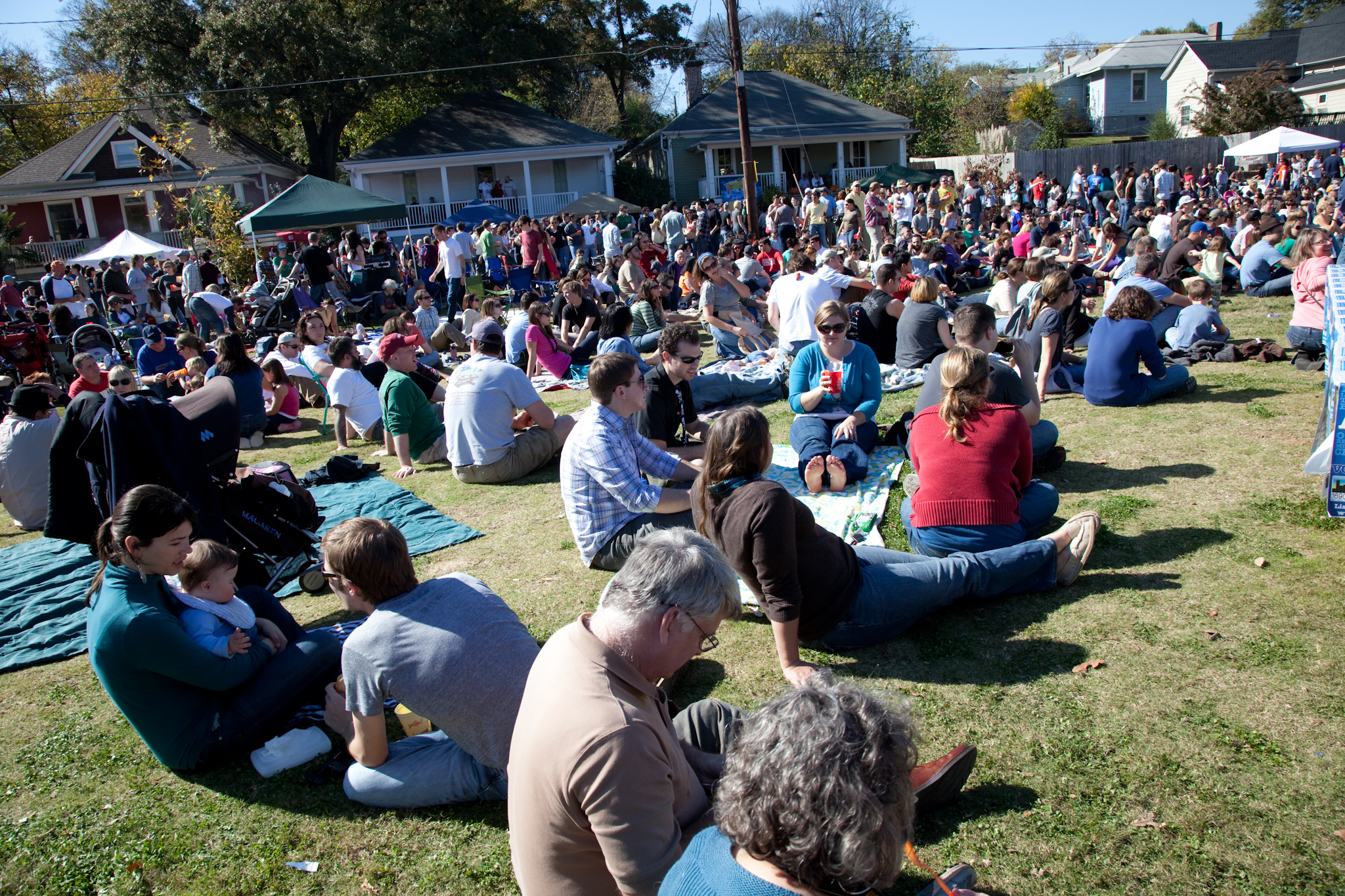
Cabbagetown Chomp and Stomp in Cabbagetown Park

The Krog Street Tunnel, which connects Cabbagetown and Inman Park, has become the city's centerpoint for street art. Street art, tags and graffiti are present in the Krog Street Tunnel and in adjacent areas of Reynoldstown notably the wall of the CSX Hulsey railyard along Wylie Street. The art in Cabbagetown is managed by the Wallkeepers Committee of the Cabbagetown Initiative, who in 2012 allowed La Pandilla from Puerto Rico and Trek Matthews from Atlanta to paint two murals at the request of the Living Walls street art organization.

Forward Warrior is an annual live street art painting event founded by Atlanta Artist Peter Ferrari. In recent years, Forward Warrior has covered the walls along Wylie Street and Tennelle Street in Cabbagetown with dozens of works of street art. Several of the murals created for Forward Warrior are mapped on the Atlanta Street Art Map.

The neighborhood's main festival is Chomp and Stomp, a bluegrass and chili festival that occurs in November. Over the past few years, Chomp and Stomp has included a 5k run and upwards of 16,000 attendees.
