= Josh Dawsey =

American journalist

- Born: 1989 or 1990
- Education: University of South Carolina (BA)
- Occupation: Journalist

Josh Dawsey (born July 13, 1989/1990) is an American journalist who is a political investigations reporter for The Wall Street Journal.

== Education ==
Dawsey was born in 1989 or 1990 to Debbie (née Moore) and Carl Dawsey. He is from Aynor, South Carolina. In 2003, while attending Aynor High School, he expressed an interest in pursuing an interest in journalism. He won first place in a regional spelling bee in 2004 and competed at the 2004 Scripps National Spelling Bee. In 2010, he interned for 10 weeks with The Island Packet in Hilton Head. In 2010, he was news editor of The Daily Gamecock at the University of South Carolina. He received a B.A. in journalism from the college.

== Career ==
Dawsey began his career as a reporter at The Wall Street Journal, first covering Governor Chris Christie before being assigned to New York to write about Mayor Bill de Blasio. He moved to Politico to become a White House reporter in 2016, before assuming the same role at The Washington Post in 2017.

Dawsey won the White House Correspondents Association's Award for Deadline Reporting in 2018 and again in 2019. He was part of a team that won the 2022 Pulitzer Prize for Public Service for its coverage of the January 6 United States Capitol attack. He was part of a team that won the 2024 Pulitzer Prize for National Reporting for an extensive set of stories about the role of the AR-15 in American life.

Dawsey, with Tyler Pager and Isaac Arnsdorf, authored the 2025 book 2024: How Trump Retook the White House and the Democrats Lost America.

Dawsey won the White House Correspondents Association's Aldo Beckman Memorial Award in 2026.
