= Individuals and Households program =

Disaster relief program in the USA

FEMA’s Individuals and Households program provides financial help and direct services after a disaster. Applicants must be U.S. citizens with primary home losses not covered by insurance in a presidentially declared disaster area. IHP covers direct reimbursements for home repairs and replacements, rental, and lodging assistance. The program also covers assistance for indirect expenses related to disasters including funeral, medical and dental, child care, and other miscellaneous expenses.
