= Fulton Bag and Cotton Mills =

Coordinates: 33.751°N 84.369°W

- Plant of Fulton Bag and Cotton Mills, c. 1910–1930

General information
- Location: Cabbagetown, Atlanta, Georgia
- Completed: 1881

Fulton Bag and Cotton Mills is a formerly operating mill complex located in the Cabbagetown neighborhood of Atlanta, Georgia. Construction of the complex began in 1881 on the south side of the Georgia Railroad line, east of Downtown Atlanta, on the site of the Atlanta Rolling Mill. The site now includes separate phases of multi-family dwellings including for-rent apartments (called The Fulton Cotton Mill Lofts) and for-sale condominiums (The Stacks).

== Early history ==
The beginnings of the Fulton Bag and Cotton Mills can be traced to Atlanta in 1868, when Jacob Elsas, an immigrant of German Jewish descent who had recently arrived in Atlanta from Cincinnati, began work in the city in the rag, paper, and hide business. Elsas soon recognized the need of his and other area businesses for cloth and paper containers to house their goods. Within two or three years Elsas had switched to the new business of manufacturing cloth and paper bags and had joined forces with fellow German Jewish immigrant Isaac May. In January 1872, the new company became known as Elsas, May and Company. Located in the former Atlanta slave market house, the company expanded during the 1870s; by the end of the decade, the firm consisted of a bleachery, print shop, and bag mill, and it employed between 100 and 160 workers, including women and children.

=== Construction on the current site ===
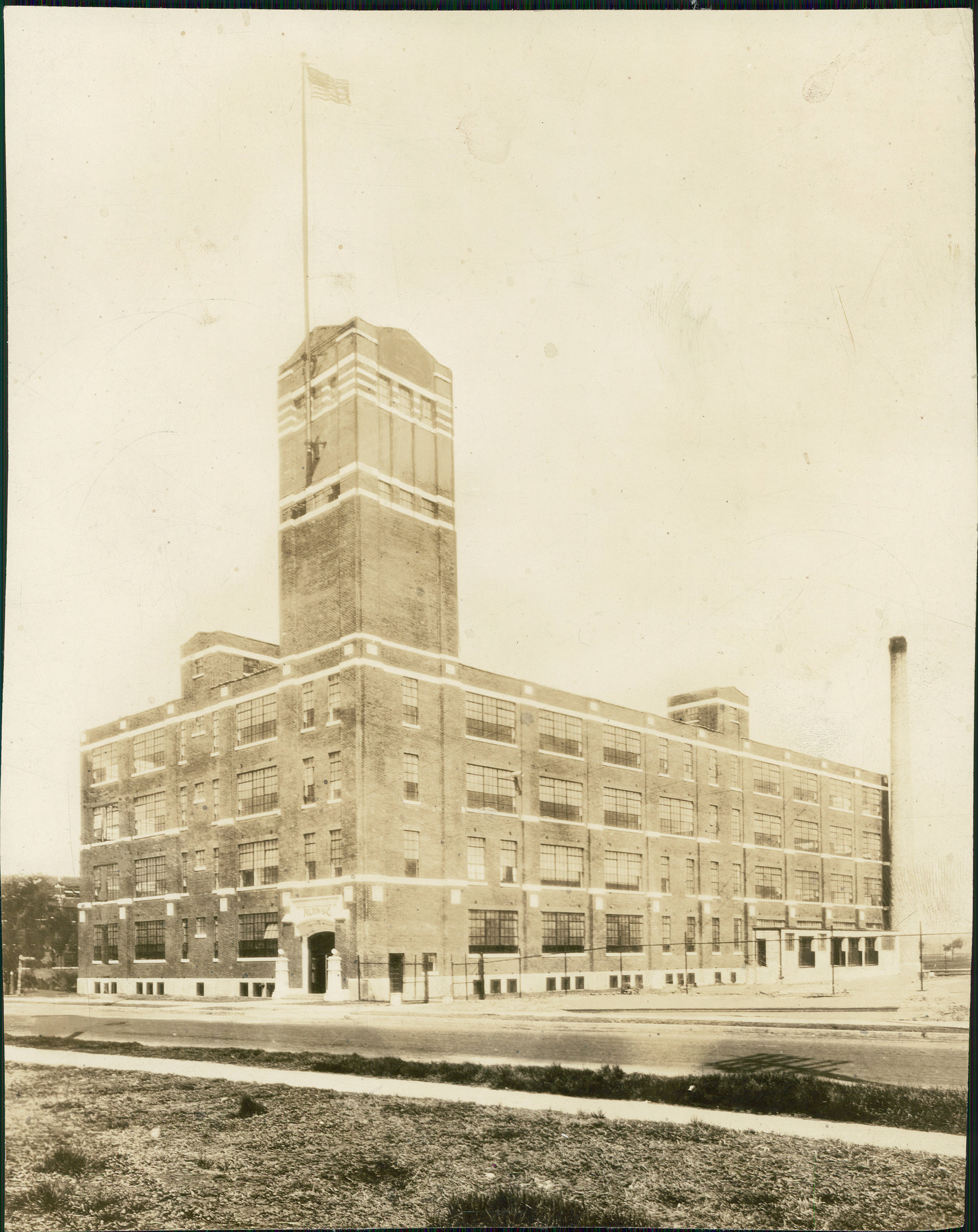
Minneapolis plant (1924)

After receiving financial backing from Cincinnati banker Lewis Seasongood, the company began construction of a new complex of buildings on the south side of the Georgia Railroad line, east of downtown. By 1881 the company had become known as the Fulton Cotton Spinning Company, adding a bag factory to the new site in 1882. By the end of the 1880s the partnership between Jacob Elsas and Isaac May had discontinued. One part of the company evolved into the Elsas, May Paper Company and the other, led by Jacob Elsas and incorporated in 1889, became the Fulton Bag and Cotton Mill Company.

Within a few years it had outgrown the capacity of the existing buildings, resulting in the construction of a second mill on the Atlanta site in 1895, with more than 40,000 spindles. A third mill added 50,000 additional spindles by 1907. In addition, a neighboring village with housing for the mill workers was well established by the turn of the twentieth century. Bag plants in New Orleans and St. Louis were bought during the 1890s, and mills in New York and Dallas began operation in the early years of the twentieth century. Additional plants in Minneapolis and Kansas City were established during and after World War I, and a plant in Denver was added in 1945, at the end of World War II. Expansion of the Atlanta plant also continued throughout the first half of the twentieth century: offices, two picker buildings, and several warehouses were constructed during these years, and the Jacob Elsas Clinic and Nursery was established in the early 1940s.

=== Labor strikes ===
Despite the early prosperity of the Fulton Bag and Cotton Mills, the company was troubled by periods of labor unrest. A wage dispute resulted in a two-day strike in November 1885. A second brief strike occurred in August 1897, when white workers protested the hiring of 25 black women. The 1897 strike was settled after five days.

A lengthier strike began in 1914, triggered by management's disapproval of the growing efforts among the workers to join the United Textile Workers. Besides the issue of unionization, the strikers demanded an increase in wages, a 54-hour work week, and a decrease in the use of child labor. The strike gained national attention when the newly formed U.S. Commission on Industrial Relations sent representatives to Atlanta to gather testimonies in March 1915. The strike ultimately failed in May 1915.

== The Elsas family ==
Many of Jacob Elsas' large family assumed management roles in Atlanta as well as in the other locations of the company. After his retirement at age 70, Jacob turned over the Presidency of the firm to his son Oscar in 1914. Sons Victor, Louis, and David worked in New Orleans, New York, and Dallas, respectively. Another son, Benjamin, succeeded Oscar as company president in 1924. In 1942 a grandson, Norman Elsas, assumed the presidency of the firm, followed by a second grandson, William Elsas, who served briefly as president in 1950. Following William's sudden death, Clarence Elsas, also a grandson, took over the presidency in 1951. Clarence Elsas served as president until 1956, and again held the position from 1960 to 1968.

Jacob Elsas played an instrumental role in the founding of the Georgia Institute of Technology. He became one of the early customers of the Georgia Tech shops, and he enrolled his son Oscar at the school for two years. Other family members, including Jacob's grandson William, also attended Tech. Elsas' activities also extended to philanthropy, particularly in the support of the Grand Opera House in Macon, the Hebrew Orphan's Home, and Grady Hospital in Atlanta. The elder Elsas died in 1931.

== Changes after World War II ==
Changes in packaging after World War II sparked changes within the company. Products such as multiwall paper bags, canvas goods, osnaburgs, and barrier materials replaced some of the old products, to respond to the new market opportunities presented in the postwar era. In 1956, Eastern U.S. and Midwestern U.S. investors bought controlling interest in the company, the nine bag manufacturing companies were sold, and in 1960 the parent company became Fulton Industries Inc. The Atlanta mill, which remained known as Fulton Cotton Mill, continued in operation under the management of Elsas family members until 1968. In that year Fulton Industries Inc. was sold to Allied Products Corp. Fulton Cotton Mill's last president, Meno Schoenbach, served in that position from 1971 until 1978, the year the Atlanta mill finally closed its doors.

== Current site ==
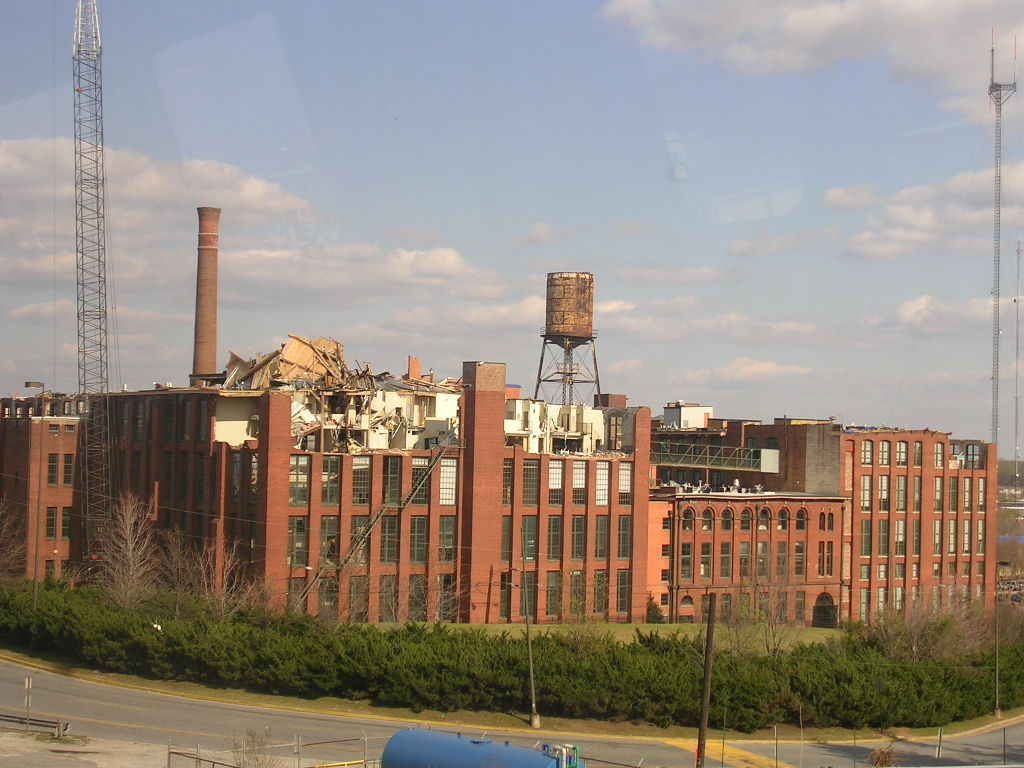
Damage from 2008 tornado

In 1997, Aderhold Properties began the renovation and redevelopment of the historic Fulton Cotton Mill in Atlanta into a community of 505 loft apartments named "The Fulton Cotton Mill Lofts."

In 1999, during the loft-conversion construction, a major fire broke out in one of the buildings under renovation. The shell survived but the entire interior had to be rebuilt. The Cabbagetown loft fire, as it came to be known, is still well-remembered because of the operator who was trapped at the top crane, unable to escape. Shown on live TV, an Atlanta Fire Department firefighter dangled by a cable from a helicopter in order to rescue him.

As the condominium craze swept through Atlanta in the early-2000s, Aderhold Properties seized the opportunity to renovate and convert three of the rental buildings into for-sale units naming the condos "The Stacks". This name, so given because of the mill's old still-standing smokestacks, was used as a marketing tool to distinguish the for-sale units from the rental units.

On Friday, March 14, 2008, around 9:45 pm, a number of buildings on the premises were damaged by an EF2 tornado. The roof was ripped off the "E" building, and debris and suction created by the wind caused the top floor to collapse, pancaking several floors below in a domino effect. As this building was part of the second phase of condo sales and had just recently begun selling units, only 15 residences had been sold, and few owners were in the building (fortunately all escaped unharmed). Several buildings in the community sustained damage and the decorative wall in the pool area was destroyed.

== Popular culture ==
The Fulton Bag and Cotton Mill in Atlanta appears as a setting in the movie Driving Miss Daisy.

It also used as the principal setting for the 1992 film Trespass, which made heavy use of the then-derelict buildings and their interiors. The deteriorated condition of the property was evidenced by broken support beams, collapsed floors, damaged walls, and extensive water damage.

The redeveloped mill is often featured as the home of the "Fab 5" in the 2018 Netflix reboot of Queer Eye.

The lofts were also prominently featured in the 2019 film What Men Want.

It was also featured in the reality television series, Love & Hip Hop Atlanta.

Most recently, one of the units in the "E Building" was renovated for season three of the HGTV television show Windy City Rehab.

== See also ==
- List of oldest structures in Atlanta
- Marie Moentmann (1901–1974), child survivor of industrial accident

== Sources ==
- Text on this page taken from the "Collection: Fulton Bag and Cotton Mills Records | Georgia Tech Archives Finding Aids". finding-aids.library.gatech.edu., Georgia Tech Archives and Records Management
