= Aynor, South Carolina =

- Town
- Seal
- Nickname: The Little Golden Town
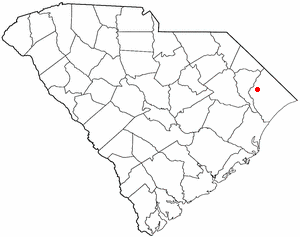
- Location in South Carolina
- Coordinates: 33°59′52″N 79°12′23″W
- Country: United States
- State: South Carolina
- County: Horry

Area
  - Total: 1.80 sq mi (4.67 km^{2})
  - Land: 1.80 sq mi (4.67 km^{2})
  - Water: 0 sq mi (0.00 km^{2})
- Elevation: 102 ft (31 m)

Population (2020)
  - Total: 974
  - Density: 540.6/sq mi (208.73/km^{2})
- Demonym: Aynorite
- Time zone: UTC-5 (EST)
  - Summer (DST): UTC-4 (EDT)
- ZIP codes: 29511, 29544
- Area codes: 843, 854
- FIPS code: 45-03430
- GNIS feature ID: 2405194
- Website: townofaynor.gov

Aynor is a small town in Horry County, South Carolina, United States, south of Galivants Ferry. As of the 2020 census, Aynor had a population of 974. It was estimated in 2018 to be 934.

== Geography ==
Aynor is in northwestern Horry County, along U.S. Route 501, which leads 15 miles (24 km) southeast to Conway, the county seat, and northwest 18 miles (29 km) to Marion. Myrtle Beach is 29 miles (47 km) to the southeast of Aynor via US 501.

According to the United States Census Bureau, the town has a total area of 1.9 square miles (4.8 km^{2}), all land.

== History ==
Aynor was settled as the Eyknor's Farm in the mid-19th century under Jacob Eyknor. After a railway terminus was added along the railroad from Conway, the town was incorporated in 1913. It elected a mayor and town wardens (now town council members). Gabriel Edwards (1849–1938) was elected the first mayor in 1913 and again in 1923 for a non-consecutive second term. The town developed as a center for production of turpentine, tobacco, and cotton as commodity crops.

== Demographics ==
Historical population
Census	Pop.	Note	%±
1920	275		—
1930	375		36.4%
1940	537		43.2%
1950	551		2.6%
1960	635		15.2%
1970	536		−15.6%
1980	643		20.0%
1990	470		−26.9%
2000	587		24.9%
2010	560		−4.6%
2020	974		73.9%
U.S. Decennial Census

=== 2020 census ===
Aynor racial composition
Race	Num.	Perc.
White (non-Hispanic)	839	86.14%
Black or African American (non-Hispanic)	64	6.57%
Native American	7	0.72%
Asian	5	0.51%
Other/Mixed	31	3.18%
Hispanic or Latino	28	2.87%

As of the 2020 United States census, there were 974 people, 298 households, and 232 families residing in the town.

=== 2010 census ===
As of the census of 2010, there were 560 people, 228 households, and 158 families residing in the town. The population density was 533.3 inhabitants per square mile (205.9/km^{2}). There were 257 housing units at an average density of 233.5 per square mile (90.2/km^{2}). The racial makeup of the town was 86.20% White, 11.75% African American, 0.51% Native American, 1.19% from other races, and 0.34% from two or more races. Hispanic or Latino of any race were 1.53% of the population.

There were 228 households, out of which 30.3% had children under the age of 18 living with them, 50.0% were married couples living together, 14.9% had a female householder with no husband present, and 30.7% were non-families. 28.5% of all households were made up of individuals, and 14.5% had someone living alone who was 65 years of age or older. The average household size was 2.57 and the average family size was 3.12.

In the town, the population was spread out, with 26.7% under the age of 18, 8.9% from 18 to 24, 28.8% from 25 to 44, 20.3% from 45 to 64, and 15.3% who were 65 years of age or older. The median age was 36 years. For every 100 females, there were 86.3 males. For every 100 females age 18 and over, there were 77.7 males.

The median income for a household in the town was $29,583, and the median income for a family was $35,417. Males had a median income of $30,781 versus $22,500 for females. The per capita income for the town was $16,076. About 13.1% of families and 19.6% of the population were below the poverty line, including 25.3% of those under age 18 and 15.4% of those age 65 or over.

== Government ==
The town is run by a Mayor-council government system. Landon Johnson is the current mayor of Aynor.

Aynor is also home to the tribal office of the Waccamaw people.

== Economy ==
In 2013, PTR Industries relocated to the Cool Springs Business Park near Aynor from Bristol, Connecticut after that state passed restrictive gun control legislation. The company said that it will hire an additional 30 workers within the first quarter of 2014, with a goal of having 120 employees in 2017.

== Education ==
Public education in all of the county is administered by Horry County Schools. In the Aynor area, the district operates Aynor High School, Aynor Middle School, and Aynor Elementary School.

Aynor has a public library, a branch of the Horry County Memorial Library.

== Notable person ==
- Josh Dawsey (born 1989/1990) – journalist
- David Scott (1945–2026) – U.S. representative for Georgia
