= Georgia Emergency Management and Homeland Security Agency =

Government agency of Georgia, U.S.

Agency overview
- Formed: 1981; 45 years ago
- Jurisdiction: Georgia
- Headquarters: 935 United Avenue SE Atlanta, Georgia 30316
- Agency executives: Brian P. Kemp, Governor of Georgia (administering authority); Josh Lamb, Director
- Parent agency: Office of the Governor
- Website: gema.georgia.gov

The Georgia Emergency Management and Homeland Security Agency (GEMA/HS) is the state agency responsible for emergency management and homeland security coordination in the U.S. state of Georgia. Operating as part of the Office of the Governor, the agency coordinates statewide preparedness, response, recovery, and hazard-mitigation efforts for natural and man-made disasters, performing a role at the state level similar to that of the federal Federal Emergency Management Agency (FEMA).

== History ==
GEMA/HS traces its statutory authority to the Georgia Emergency Management Act of 1981, enacted by the Georgia General Assembly, which created the Georgia Emergency Management Agency under the direction of a director appointed by the governor. Under the statute, the director holds office at the pleasure of the governor, may hold no other state office, and is responsible to the governor for the state's emergency management program, coordinating the activities of emergency management organizations within Georgia and maintaining liaison with emergency management agencies of other states and the federal government.

In the years following the September 11 attacks, the agency's mandate expanded to include homeland security coordination, and the agency added "Homeland Security" to its name, becoming the Georgia Emergency Management and Homeland Security Agency. A Board of Homeland Security, created in 2018, was governed by a 17-member board appointed by the governor and composed of state, local, and private-sector leaders coordinating homeland security activities in the state. On May 9, 2025, Governor Brian P. Kemp signed Senate Bill 96, repealing Article 2A of Chapter 3 of Title 38 of the Official Code of Georgia Annotated; as of July 1, 2025, the Board of Homeland Security was dissolved.

Georgia's Urban Search and Rescue (US&R) program was established and funded under the authority of GEMA/HS in 2003 to create a framework of local emergency-services personnel trained and integrated into disaster-response task forces. Search and Rescue Task Force teams stationed throughout the state can be mobilized within two to four hours of notification, deploying in-state through the State Mutual Aid Agreement or out-of-state through the Emergency Management Assistance Compact.

Following Hurricane Helene in September 2024, GEMA/HS launched the HEARTS Georgia (Housing Emergency Assistance and Recovery Through Sheltering) program in December 2024, a state-run, non-congregate sheltering program providing hotel and motel housing to survivors whose homes were majorly damaged, destroyed, or deemed uninhabitable in counties designated for FEMA Individual Assistance. The temporary sheltering program concluded on September 29, 2025, after which the agency launched the HEARTS Georgia Disaster Case Management Program to continue assisting survivors with long-term recovery across the 63 counties designated for FEMA Individual Assistance following the storm.

== Organization and leadership ==
GEMA/HS operates as part of the Office of the Governor, and its director is appointed by, and serves at the pleasure of, the Governor of Georgia.

As of 2026, the director of GEMA/HS is Josh Lamb, appointed by Governor Brian P. Kemp on February 12, 2025, succeeding Chris Stallings. Stallings had departed GEMA/HS after being appointed by President Donald Trump to a role with the Small Business Administration. Prior to his appointment, Lamb served as Lieutenant Colonel Assistant Commissioner for the Georgia Department of Public Safety, a role he assumed in October 2023, and began his law enforcement career in 1996 as a special agent with the Tri-Circuit Drug Task Force after graduating from Georgia Southern University.

Previous directors have included Chris Stallings, appointed in 2020 following the retirement of Director Homer Bryson and who came to the agency from the Georgia State Patrol, where he began his career in 2008 and most recently led the Dignitary Protection Unit; and Mike Sherberger, appointed by Governor Sonny Perdue following the resignation of director Gary McConnell, who had previously served as the agency's assistant director for 13 years and as senior advisor for homeland security at the Centers for Disease Control and Prevention.

== Functions and divisions ==
The agency's stated mission is the protection of life and property against man-made and natural disasters by directing the state's efforts in prevention, preparedness, mitigation, response, and recovery.

Emergency response and recovery: GEMA/HS works with local, state, federal, volunteer, and private agencies to respond to disasters and emergencies requiring a coordinated response. Its Public Assistance Division administers federal disaster funds for which communities become eligible after a disaster and works with local governments to ensure reconstruction and rebuilding programs reduce the risk of further losses.

Hazard mitigation: The agency's Hazard Mitigation Division assists in developing comprehensive hazard mitigation plans and projects intended to protect people and property from natural hazards. Within Georgia, the federal Hazard Mitigation Grant Program—established under Section 404 of the Stafford Act of 1988—is administered by GEMA/HS, which provides technical assistance to local governments and reviews, prioritizes, and recommends eligible projects for funding by FEMA, which makes the final funding decisions.

Homeland security: The agency's Homeland Security Division provides critical infrastructure analysis, incident management and response, fire services coordination, agroterrorism preparedness, exercise and training, and intelligence gathering and analysis. The division partners with other state agencies through the Homeland Security Task Force and the Georgia Information Sharing and Analysis Center, and coordinates with federal partners including the U.S. Department of Homeland Security on funding, training, response, and preparedness programs.

Urban Search and Rescue: Established in 2003, Georgia's Urban Search and Rescue program organizes Search and Rescue Task Force teams across the state as a "multi-hazard" discipline capable of responding to a range of emergencies; most teams meet the requirements of a FEMA Type II Urban Search and Rescue Task Force and include firefighters certified in multiple technical rescue disciplines.

Training: GEMA/HS offers training courses at a dedicated training facility on Collier Road in Forsyth, Georgia, at its Atlanta headquarters, and in local communities through instructors from within and outside the agency.

== Notable responses ==
In September 2024, GEMA/HS coordinated the state's response to Hurricane Helene. On September 25, 2024, Governor Kemp requested a federal pre-landfall Emergency Declaration in anticipation of the storm, which the White House issued the following morning, providing direct federal assistance to supplement the state's response. A subsequent federal Major Disaster Declaration extended Individual and Public Assistance to dozens of Georgia counties. The storm ultimately affected 63 counties designated for FEMA Individual Assistance between September 24 and October 30, 2024. FEMA designated the disaster EM-3616-GA.

== See also ==
- Federal Emergency Management Agency
- Georgia Department of Public Safety
- Emergency management
