= Peachtree Center =

District in Atlanta, Georgia

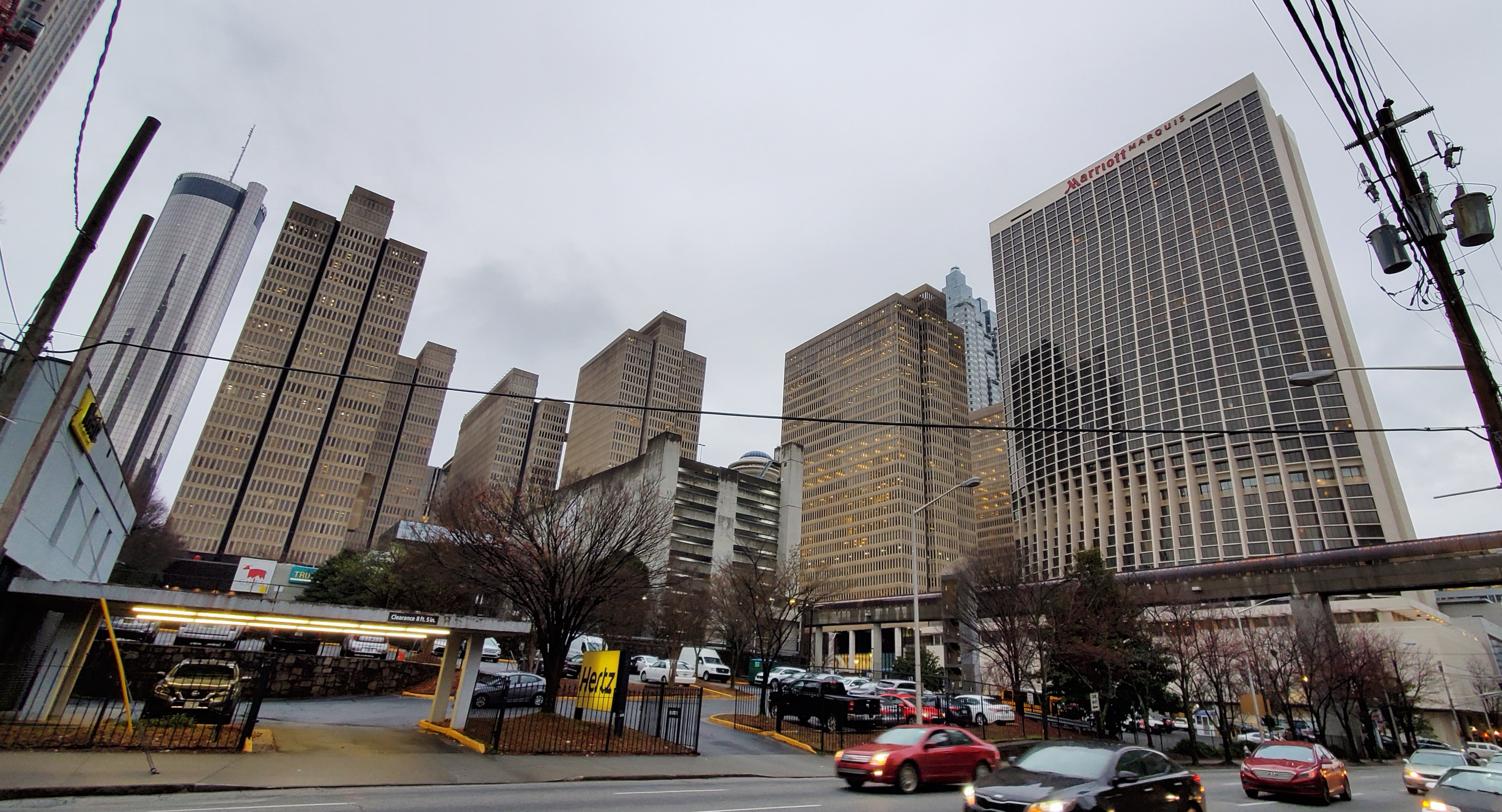
- Peachtree Center, including the Westin Peachtree Plaza Hotel (far left) and the Atlanta Marriott Marquis (far right)
- Interactive map of the Peachtree Center area

General information
- Status: Completed
- Type: Commercial, hotel, and retail complex
- Architectural style: Modern
- Location: Downtown Atlanta, Atlanta, Georgia
- Coordinates: 33.7604°N 84.3877°W

Design and construction
- Architect: John C. Portman Jr.

Peachtree Center is a district located in Downtown Atlanta, Georgia. Most of the structures that make up the district were designed by Atlanta architect John C. Portman Jr. A defining feature of the Peachtree Center is a network of enclosed pedestrian sky bridges suspended above the street-level. The district is served by the Peachtree Center MARTA station, providing access to rapid transit.

== History ==
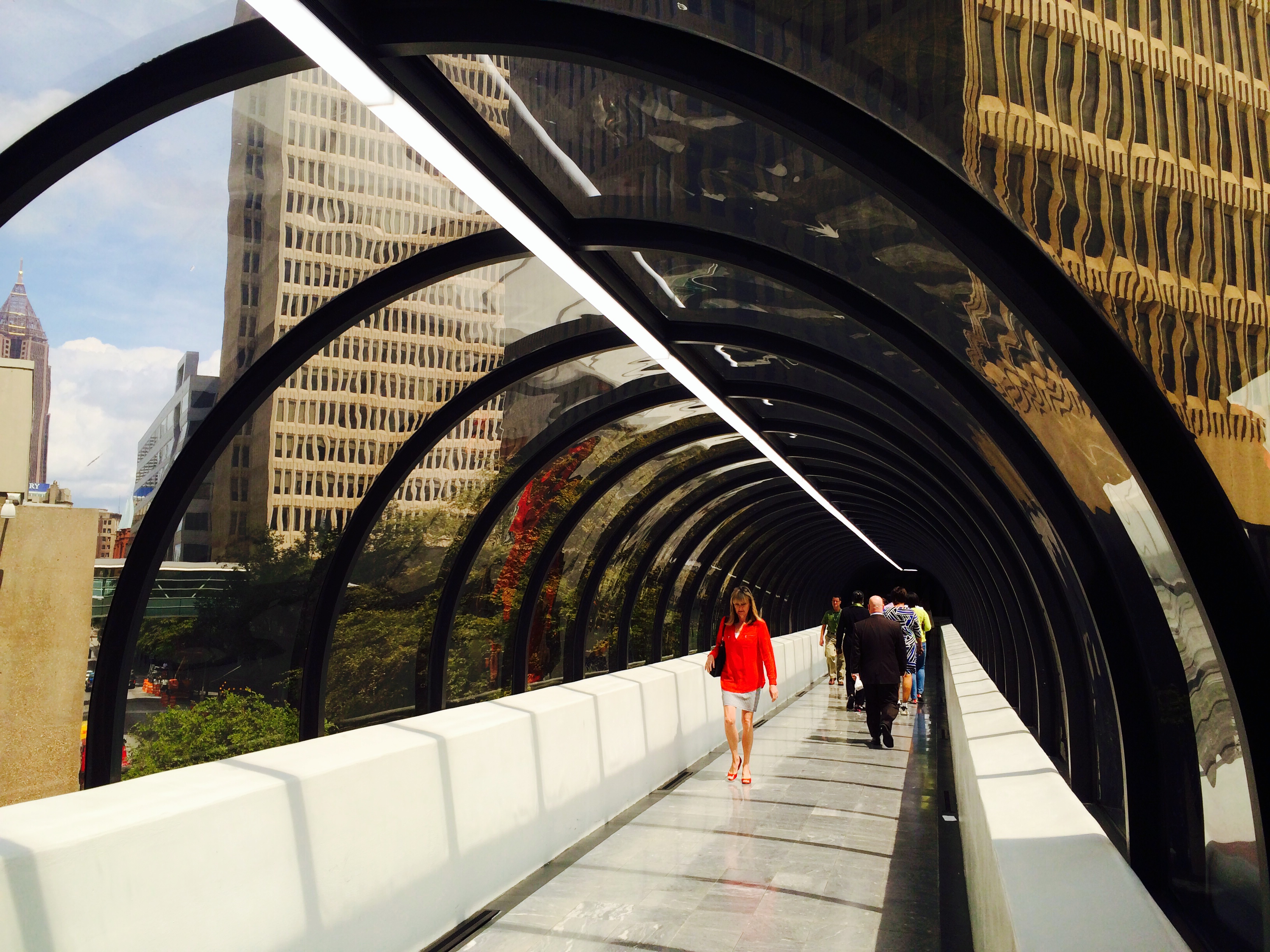
Skywalks are a defining feature of Peachtree Center

Intended to be the new downtown for Atlanta, Peachtree Center emerged as a distinct district in the early 1970s as a networked realm of convention hotels, shopping galleries, and office buildings a quarter-mile north of Five Points. Peachtree Center is notable for its uniform embodiment of the modern architectural style popular at the time. Yet the defining feature of Peachtree Center is its insular orientation, which allows patrons and workers to avoid interacting with the street level by traversing the area through sky bridges. By the mid-1980s, Peachtree Center had become the core of a dedicated hotel-convention district that lay at the heart of the Downtown economy, even as the remainder of Downtown Atlanta deteriorated markedly.

While at the time Peachtree Center was considered the salvation of a decaying downtown Atlanta, contemporary city planning is highly critical of such insular environments that "turn their back" on the city streets. Thus, as intown Atlanta began its post-1990 resurgence, Peachtree Center was increasingly criticized as an area that epitomized contemporary Atlanta's generic urbanity and sense of placelessness. Other critics claim that Peachtree Center is disorienting, killed downtown street-life, and disregarded the existing urban context.

The center was recognized for its architecture with listing on the National Register of Historic Places in 2018. In 2025, the Peachtree Center towers were placed for sale after the former owner experienced financial issues.

== Architecture ==
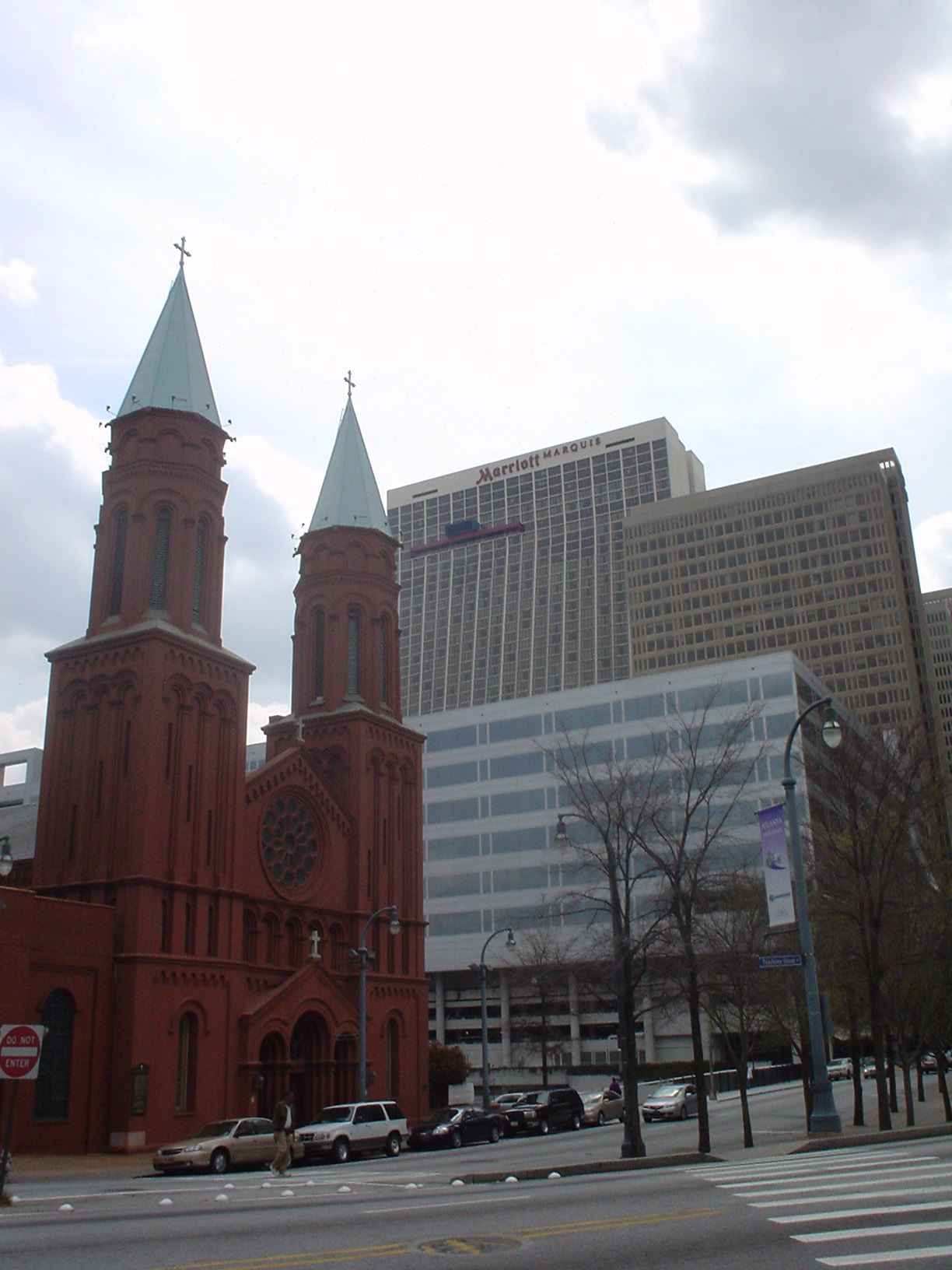
Basilica of the Sacred Heart of Jesus, located on Peachtree Center Avenue

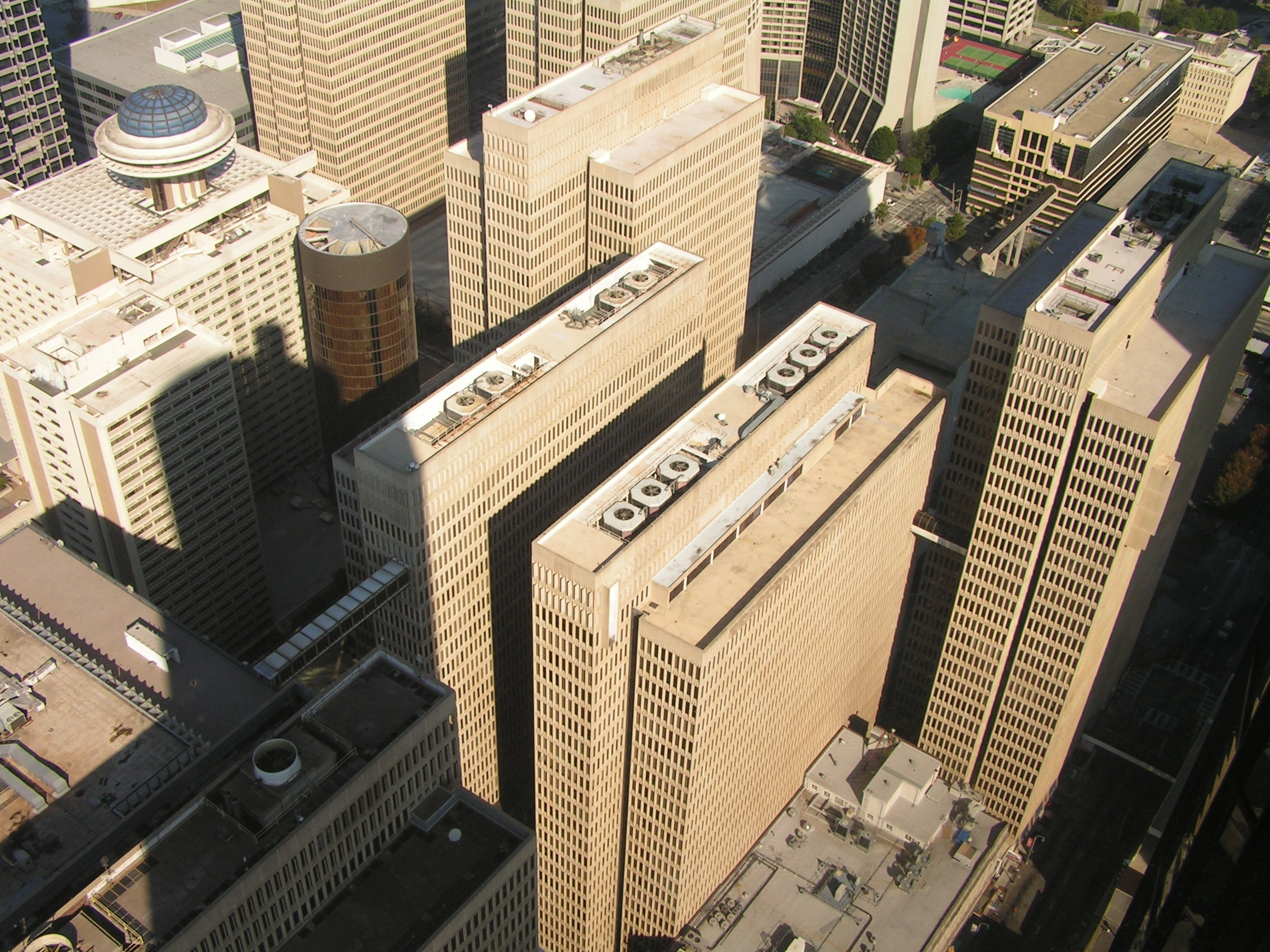
The beige buildings of Peachtree Center

Name	Height	Floors	Year	Notes
Peachtree Center Tower; 230 Peachtree Street	116 m (381 ft)	31 floors	1965	
Peachtree Center North (Gas Light Tower); 235 Peachtree Street	101 m (331 ft)	27 floors	1968	
Peachtree Center South; 225 Peachtree Street	101 m (331 ft)	27 floors	1970	
Hyatt Regency Atlanta	104 m (341 ft)	24 floors	1967	
Harris Tower; 233 Peachtree Center NE	116 m (381 ft)	31 floors	1974	
Peachtree Center International Tower (Cain Tower); 229 Peachtree Street NE	115 m (377 ft)	30 floors	1976	
Marquis I 245 Peachtree Center NE	115 m (377 ft)	30 floors	1985	
Marquis II; 285 Peachtree Center NE	115 m (377 ft)	30 floors	1989	
Peachtree Athletic Club; 227 Courtland Street NE		9 floors	1985	
Westin Peachtree Plaza Hotel; 210 Peachtree Street NW	220.5 m (723 ft)	73 floors	1976	
Atlanta Marriott Marquis; 265 Peachtree Center Avenue NE	169 m (554 ft)	52 floors	1985	
AmericasMart; Various Addresses		Various Heights	1961, 1979, 1992, 2008	
Truist Plaza; 303 Peachtree Street NE	265 m (869 ft)	60 floors	1992	
American Cancer Society Center; 250 Williams Street NW		10 floors	1989	

== Governmental Organisations ==
The U.S. Census Bureau has its Atlanta Regional Census Center in Suite 1000 in the Marquis Two Tower. Several additional U.S. Government agencies have their southeast regional offices located in the Harris Tower, including the Department of Transportation, Department of Labor, Small Business Administration, and Internal Revenue Service.

The Consulate-General of Argentina is located in Suite 2101 in the Marquis One Tower. The Consulate-General of Germany is located in Suite 901 of the Marquis Two Tower. The Consulate-General of South Korea is located in Suite 500 in the International Tower.

== Gallery ==
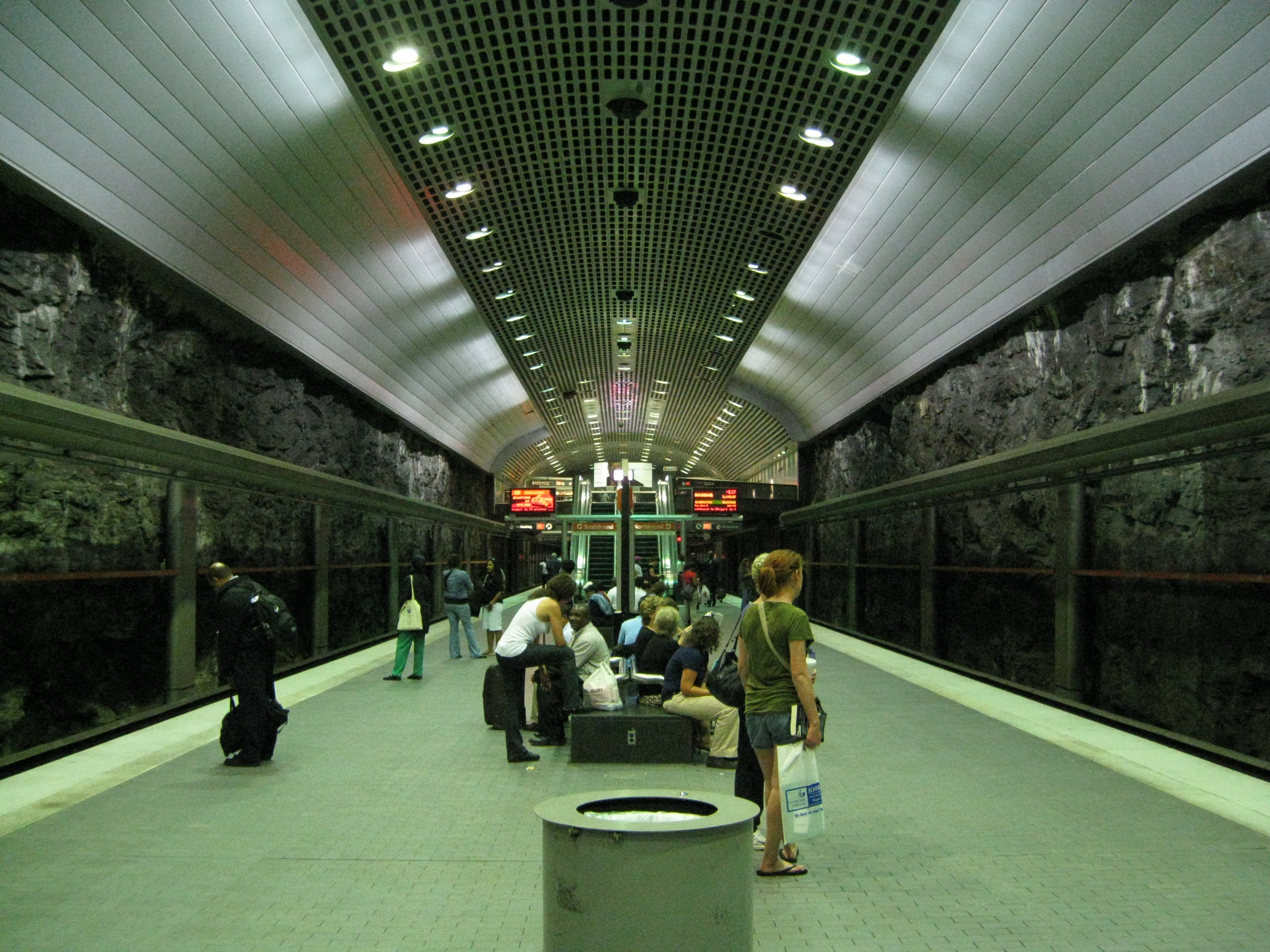
Peachtree Center MARTA Station

== See also ==
- Embarcadero Center, San Francisco
- Rockefeller Center, New York
