= Westin Peachtree Plaza Hotel =

Skyscraper hotel in downtown Atlanta, Georgia, United States

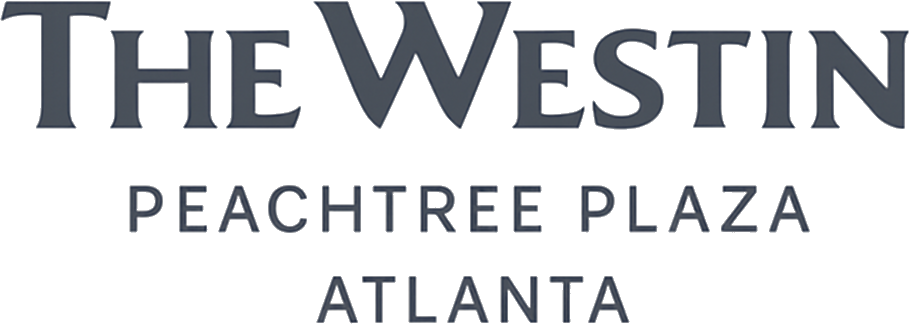

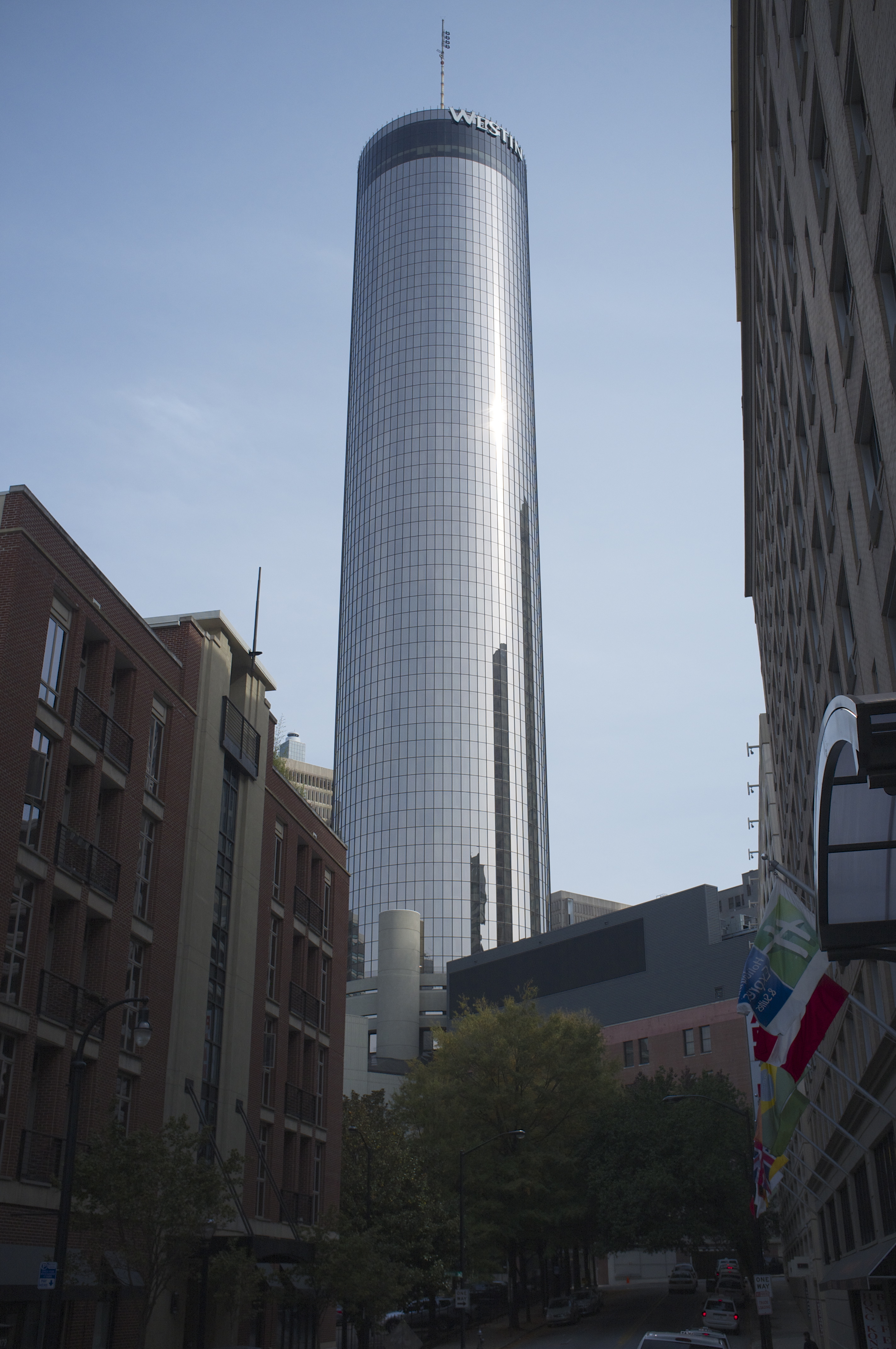
- Westin Peachtree Plaza Hotel in 2012
- Interactive map of the Westin Peachtree Plaza Hotel area
- Hotel chain: Westin Hotels

General information
- Location: 210 Peachtree Street NW; Atlanta, Georgia, United States
- Coordinates: 33.75943°N 84.38855°W
- Opening: February 27, 1976
- Operator: Marriott International

Height
- Height: Roof: 723.0 ft (220.37 m); Antenna: 883 ft (269.1 m)

Technical details
- Floor count: 73
- Floor area: Meeting space: 80,000 sq ft (7,400 m^{2})

Design and construction
- Architects: John Portman & Associates; Ai Group

Other information
- Number of rooms: 1,068
- Number of suites: 40
- Number of restaurants: Sun Dial Restaurant Bar & View; The Lobby Bar; Sun Dial Bar; The Café
- Parking: 300 spaces

Website
- Official website

The Westin Peachtree Plaza, Atlanta, is a skyscraper hotel on Peachtree Street in downtown Atlanta, Georgia, adjacent to the Peachtree Center complex and the former Davison's/Macy's flagship store with 1,073 rooms. At 723.0 ft (220.37 m) and 73 stories, a total building area of 1,196,240 sq ft (111,134 m^{2}) and a 187 ft (57 m) diameter, the tower was the tallest hotel in the world upon completion in 1976. Today, it is the fourth-tallest hotel in the Western Hemisphere, and the 28th tallest all-hotel building in the world.

== History ==
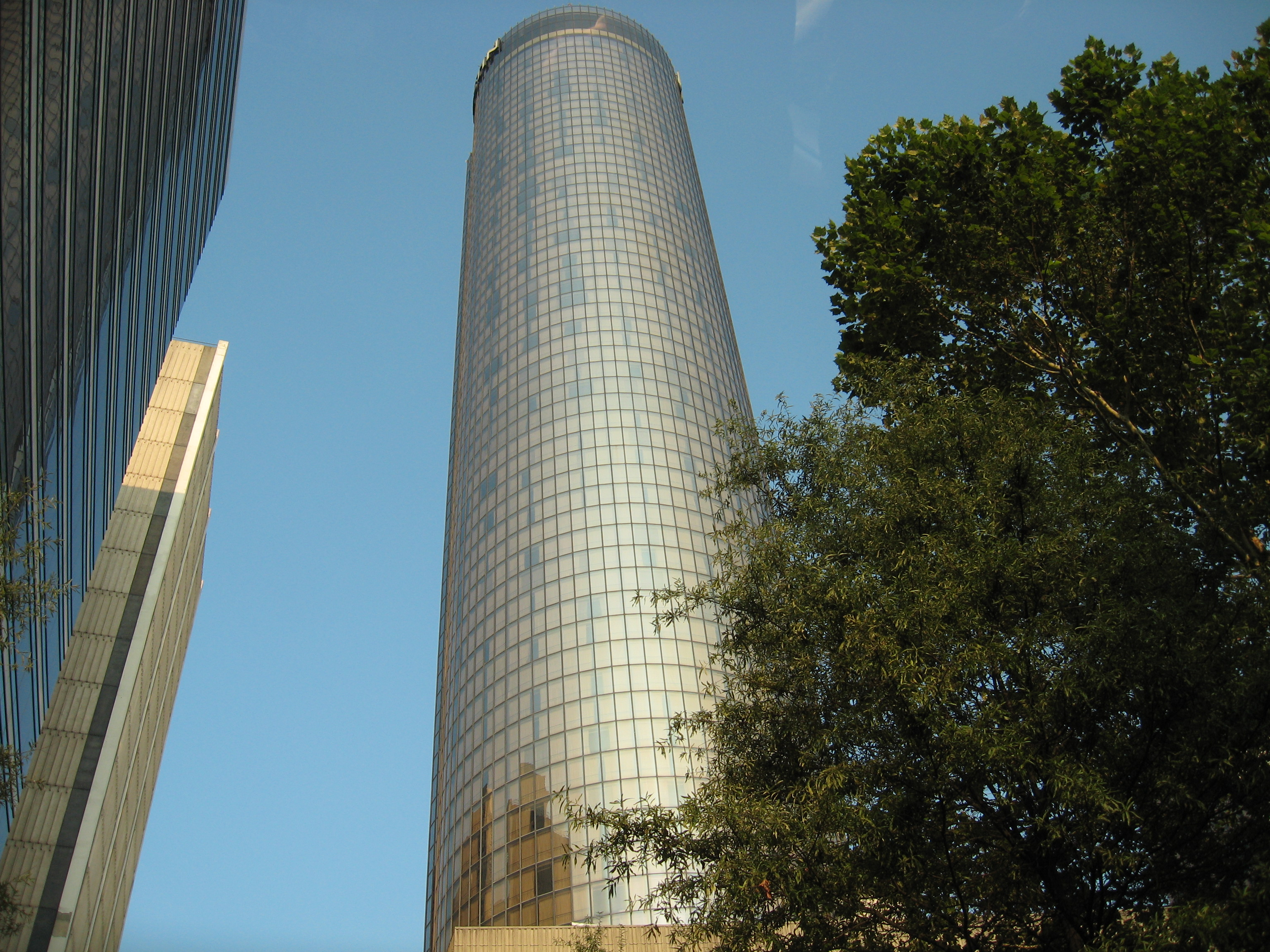
Street level view of the Westin Peachtree Plaza Hotel

The first building on the site was the first official Georgia Governor's Mansion in Atlanta, a Victorian-style home purchased by the state in 1870 at the southwest corner of Peachtree Street and Cain Street (later International Boulevard, now Andrew Young International Boulevard). After housing 17 governors of Georgia (each limited to a single term of office) until 1921, it was demolished in 1923 for the Henry Grady Hotel, named for Atlanta Constitution newspaper journalist/magnate and philanthropist Henry W. Grady. That and the Roxy Theatre were in turn demolished for the current building.

Designed by architect John C. Portman Jr., the hotel opened on February 27, 1976 as the Peachtree Plaza Hotel, managed by Western International Hotels. The hotel was Atlanta's tallest building until 1987, when it was overtaken by One Atlantic Center. It was the tallest hotel in the world for a year, until it was surpassed in 1977 by its architectural twin, the Detroit Plaza Hotel, the central tower of the Portman-designed Renaissance Center in Detroit. It was also the tallest building in the southeastern United States, topping One Shell Square in New Orleans. It lost that title in 1983, when the Southeast Financial Center in Miami was built. It was the tallest building in downtown Atlanta for 13 years until it was surpassed by 191 Peachtree Tower, which in turn was topped by SunTrust Plaza (then One Peachtree Center). It still has more floors than any other building in Atlanta, as well as the state of Georgia.

Western International Hotels was rebranded as Westin Hotels in 1981, and the hotel was soon after renamed The Westin Peachtree Plaza. The hotel was heavily featured in the 1981 film Sharky's Machine starring Burt Reynolds. Stuntman Dar Robinson, doubling for Henry Silva at the end of the film, dropped 220 feet (67 m) from what appeared to be the Westin Peachtree Plaza, setting a record for the highest freefall (unrestrained) jump from a building in a film. In actuality, however, the stunt scene was filmed at the nearby Hyatt Regency Hotel, using its shorter but similar cylindrical-shaped Radius Tower.

In June 2026, Portman Holdings, the real estate development firm founded by the tower's original architect, purchased the hotel property. Alongside the acquisition, the firm announced plans to launch a comprehensive, multi-million-dollar renovation of the landmark tower.

== Architectural details ==
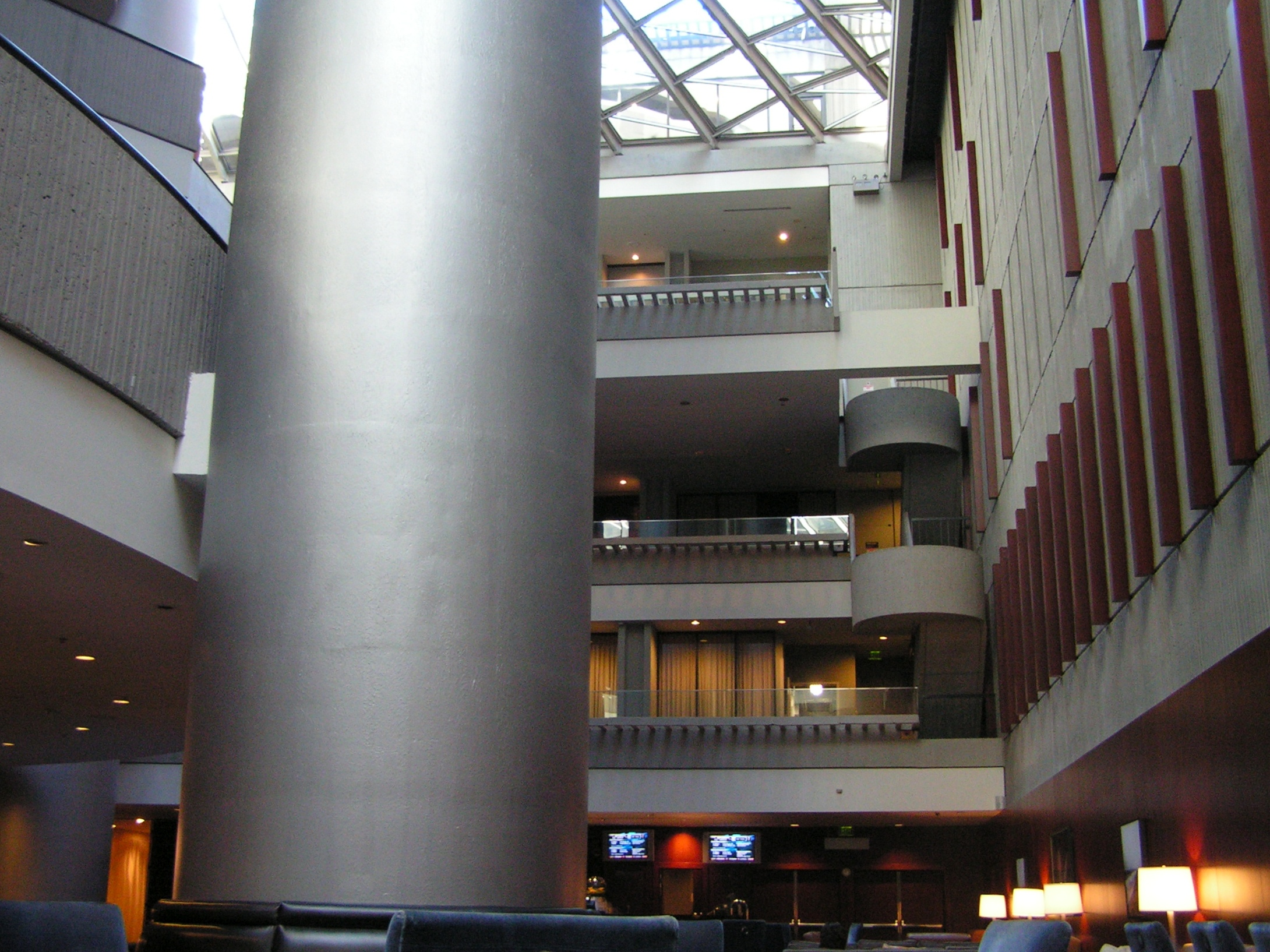
Inside the Westin Peachtree Plaza

The building is cast in reflective glass in a cylindrical shape that reflects much of the downtown skyline (though each of the around 5600 windows are flat and not convex). Another small cylinder runs the full height of the building on one side, and accommodates two scenic elevators. The uppermost floors hold the Sun Dial Restaurant and Bar, a revolving restaurant that offers panoramic views of the city and its environs. The top floor of the restaurant completes a full revolution every 30 minutes, and the bottom every 60 minutes.

When the building first opened in 1976, the seven-story tall lobby atrium rose out of a half-acre, fountain-filled indoor lake known as the "lagoon.” The lobby bar was surrounded by large, oval "cocktail islands" which appeared to float on the lake and the entire area was decorated with tapestries, sculptures, cages with live birds and over 100 trees. According to a contemporary postcard, architect Portman designed this area "as a modern interpretation of a Venetian Plaza". In a newspaper advertisement, the hotel called the lobby "more like a park" and claimed it was "a total departure from any other you've ever seen."

Not everyone was impressed, however. In a humorous 1982 column dismissing the extravagance of modern hotel lobbies, George F. Will complained that "Atlanta's Peachtree Plaza has a lobby that Lewis and Clark could not have found their way across". He compared the "pond-like body of water" to "a Walden in everything but charm in which you can drown yourself, which you might wish to do".

Starting in February 1986, the lake was drained, and the lobby was redesigned as a more standard hotel gathering place with carpet, chairs, and sofas as part of a $11 million renovation. Portman stated the new atrium design was inspired by "a sophisticated Tivoli Gardens, with a lot of color and light and activities going on."

The hotel was also notable for its Peachtree Ballroom, which was the largest in Atlanta when it opened, seating 3,500 people. It has since been surpassed by the Georgia International Convention Center, which lays claim to having the largest ballroom in the state of Georgia.

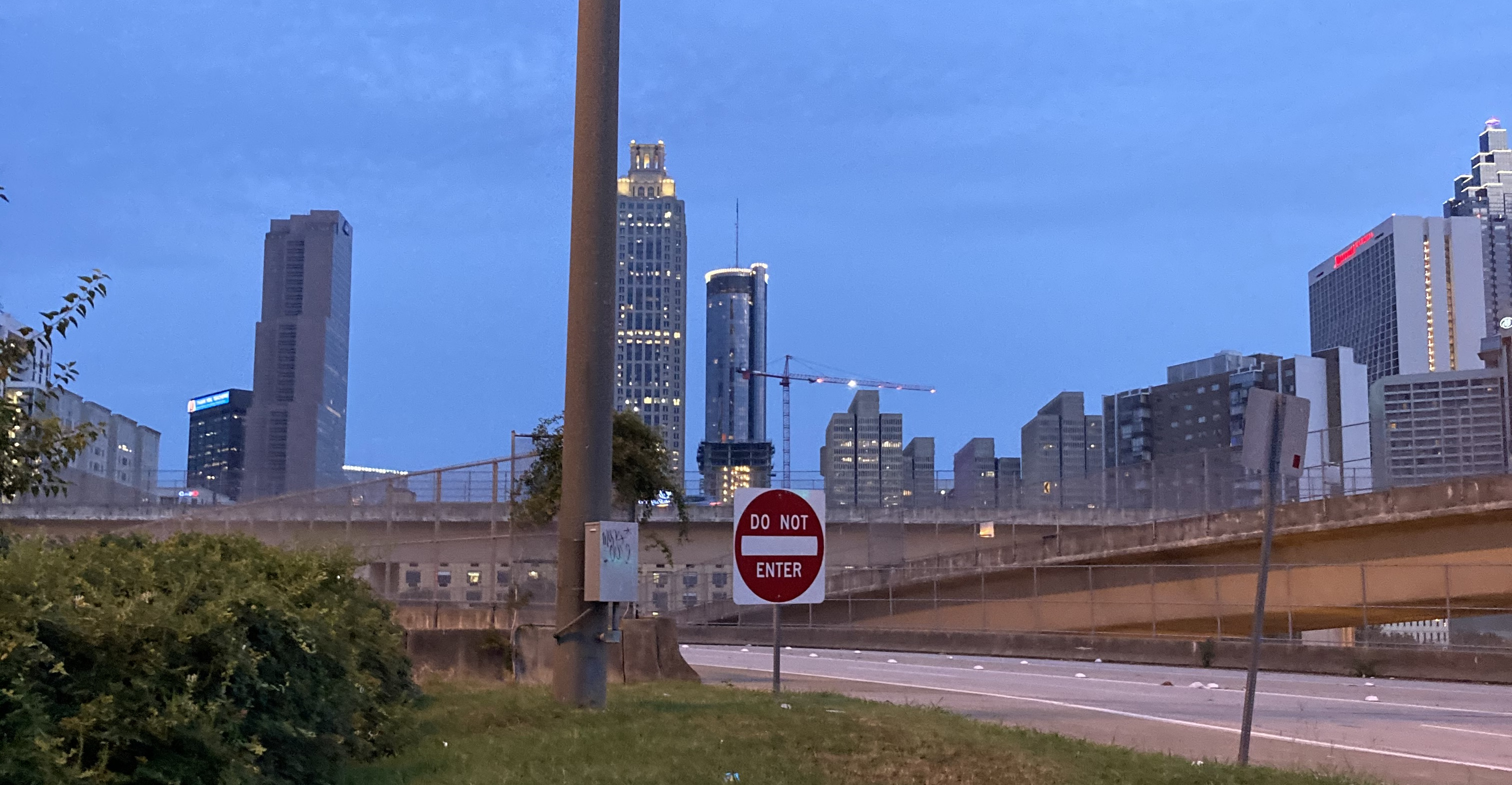
Westin Peachtree, center, background, Atlanta skyline

== Broadcasting ==
Several local broadcasters have transmitted from an antenna mast atop the building, beginning when it became Atlanta's tallest, but declining since others have been built around it.

The original antenna once carried the signal of WUPA TV 69 from the time it first went on-air as WVEU, but that station moved because the Westin tower lacked space for an antenna to send the station's digital television signal. Two LPTV stations currently transmit from the top: analog WTBS-LP 26, and digital-only WTHC-LD 42.1. As of 2009, WTBS-LP is moving to the Bank of America Plaza, from the same antenna as co-owned WANN-LP/WANN-CD, and possibly future digital WTBS-LD 30.

The main FM antenna, the four large elements seen at the top of the mast in both outdoor pictures on this page, recently belonged to WZGC FM 92.9 ("92.9 The Game"), while a smaller antenna still carries backup signals for that station and previously for WVEE FM 103.3 ("V-103"), both owned by CBS Radio. WWWQ FM 100.5 ("Q100", then “Rock 100.5”, now WNNX FM (“99X”) first used the same antenna when it moved to Atlanta, before it upgraded and relocated within the city, but it has since switched back. WSTR FM 94.1 ("Star 94") also shared the main FM antenna with 92.9 when it was originally installed, with the power from both stations' transmitters being combined into a single antenna through a diplexer. Both WSTR and WZGC still list this as their allotment location.

There is also an XM Satellite Radio repeater.

== 2008 tornado ==
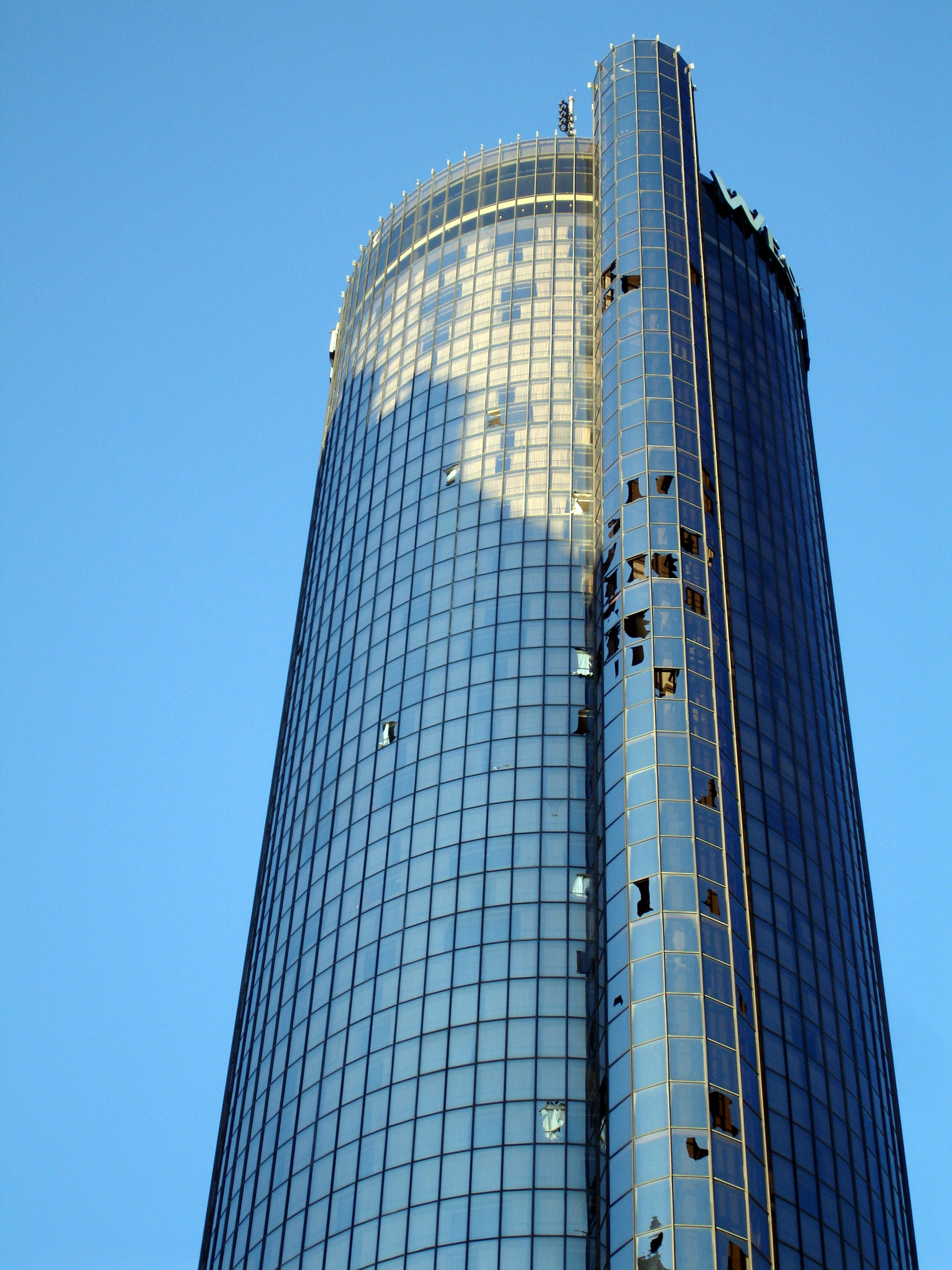
Damaged glass on the Westin Peachtree Plaza Hotel from the 2008 tornado

On March 14, 2008, the Westin sustained severe damage when a tornado tore through downtown Atlanta, with over 500 windows broken. It was the first tornado to have hit the downtown area. The building swayed back and forth two feet in either direction, as it was designed.

By 2009, the Westin was the only building in downtown Atlanta to have not replaced its broken windows, which instead were still covered with black-painted plywood on the outside, and drywall on the inside. This is because the 1/4 inch (6.4 mm) uninsulated glass was no longer made by PPG Industries, and even identical new windows would look mismatched because of weathering due to three decades of sunshine. Additionally, new building codes require insulated glass that can withstand winds up to 90 miles per hour (145 km/h) instead of 75 miles per hour (120 km/h), necessitating heavier and more expensive glass. Replacement of all 6,350 windows was expected to begin in June or July 2009 and continue from the top down until summer 2010 at a cost of over $20 million. Like the original, the new windows are also mirrored, but feature a slight bronze tint. Each pane measures 52 in × 110 in (130 cm × 280 cm) and weighs 270 lb (120 kg) with four panes required for each room. More than 600 tons of glass were to be recycled.

Skanska completed the Westin Peachtree Plaza exterior window renovation in September 2010. On November 9, 2010, renovation of the Sundial Restaurant at the top of the building was completed, repairing tornado damage done to it two years prior.

== Deaths ==
- On March 22, 2016, 61-year-old employee Carolyn Robinson died after becoming locked inside a walk-in freezer. The hotel was fined $12,471 for exposing their employee to "entrapment hazards" and failing to ensure the exit door remained "unobstructed/unrestricted".
- On April 14, 2017, five-year-old child Charlie Holt died from head injuries sustained in the Sun Dial restaurant, reportedly after becoming trapped between a wall and furniture. When exiting the restaurant, Charlie got his head stuck between a booth and a wall. The boy's parents tried to break him free, but their attempts proved no avail and he received an injury to his head. The boy died an hour later at Grady Memorial Hospital. As a result, the restaurant itself is still open, but the rotation feature has been indefinitely suspended.

== See also ==
- Hotels in Atlanta
- List of skyscrapers
- List of tallest buildings in Atlanta
- List of tallest buildings in the United States
