= Bund Center =

- 外滩中心/金光外滩金融中心
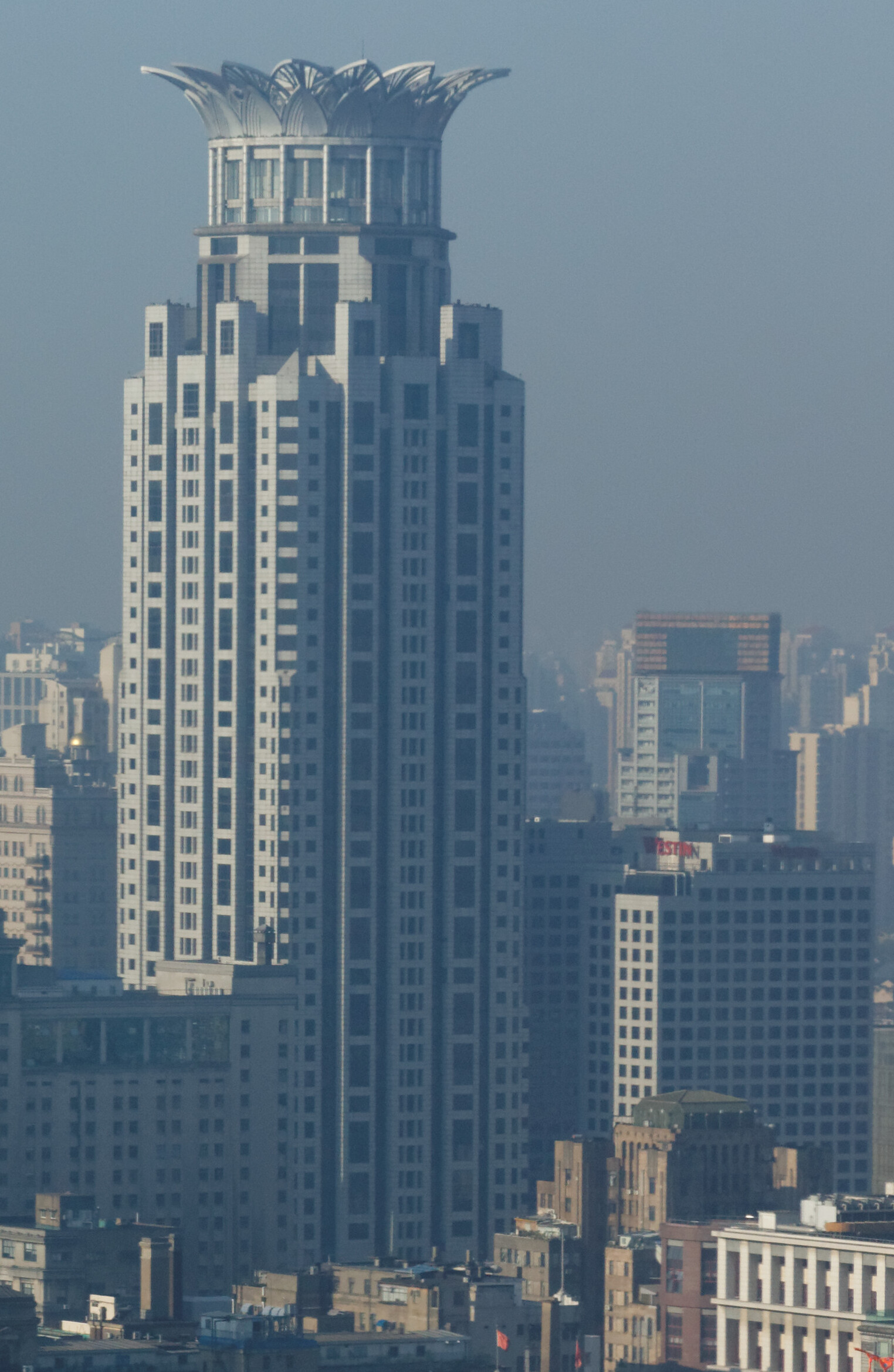
- Bund Center in 2013
- Interactive map of the Bund Center area
- Former names: Bund Financial Centre; Shanghai Golden Beach Tower

General information
- Type: Commercial offices
- Architectural style: Postmodernism
- Location: 88 Henan Road Central / Yan'an Road; Shanghai, China
- Coordinates: 31.234491°N 121.482643°E
- Construction started: 1997
- Completed: 2002

Height
- Roof: 198 m (650 ft)

Technical details
- Floor count: 45 (+3 below-grade)
- Floor area: 83,000 m^{2} (890,000 sq ft)

Design and construction
- Architect: John Portman & Associates

Bund Center is a 198 m (650 ft), 50-storey tower in the Huangpu area of Shanghai, China. Designed by the architects of John Portman and Associates, the tower was completed in 2002.

The building is mainly used for offices and major tenants of the building are Deloitte Touche Tohmatsu, Nokia, APP and Regus. The Bund Center's prominent outer appearance is the crown located on top of the building. A total of 16 indicator lights are installed so that the crown illuminates a golden light at nighttime. The investors of the building are Shanghai Golden Bund Real Estate CO., LTD. Asia Food and Properties LTD. and Shanghai Huangpu Investment (Group) Development CO., LTD.

The Westin Bund Center hotel is attached to the Bund Center, offering dining and entertainment experience to visitors.

== See also ==
- List of tallest buildings in Shanghai
