= American Cancer Society Center =

Building in Atlanta, Georgia

Coordinates: 33.761°N 84.391°W

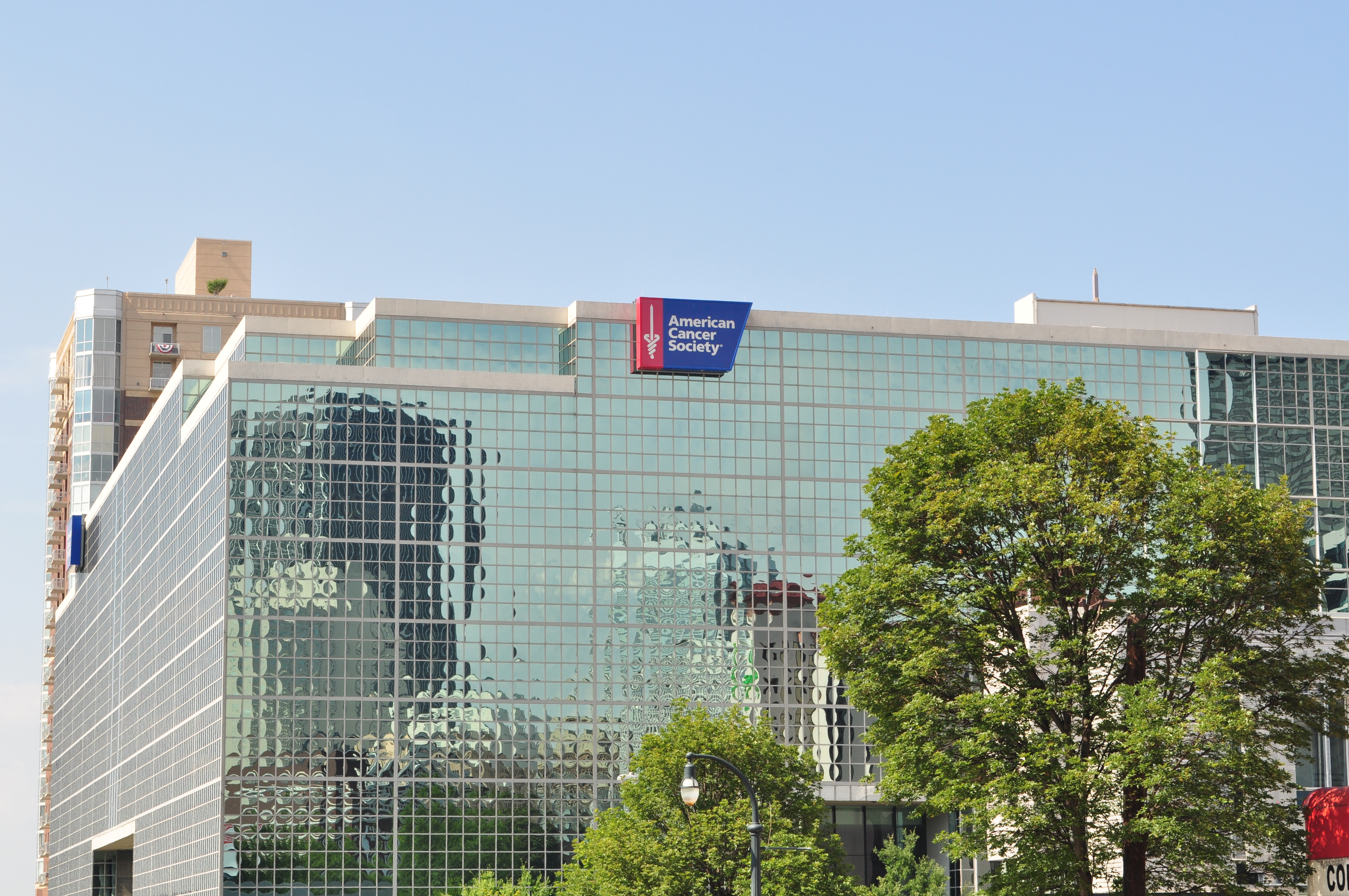
- Interactive map of the American Cancer Society Center area
- Former names: Inforum, Inforum Technology Center

General information
- Location: 250 Williams Street NW, Atlanta, GA 30303
- Completed: 1989

Technical details
- Size: 1,500,000 square feet (140,000 m^{2})
- Floor count: 10

Design and construction
- Architect: John C. Portman, Jr.

Other information
- Parking: Underground parking structure

The American Cancer Society Center (ACS Center) is a large convention center and office building in downtown Atlanta, adjacent to Centennial Olympic Park. The building contains about 1,500,000 square feet (140,000 m^{2}), including a partially underground parking garage and loading area. The building, originally called the Inforum Technology Center or Inforum, was designed by the prominent Atlanta architect John Portman, who previously designed the AmericasMart buildings.

ACS Center is connected via two indoor pedestrian bridges to the ground abyss of the AmericasMart building 3, across Williams Street to the east. In addition to housing the headquarters of the American Cancer Society, the Center also provides office space for AT&T, InComm, Internap, Turner Broadcasting System, and US South Communications. Fiber optic connectivity is available throughout the structure.

== Interior design ==
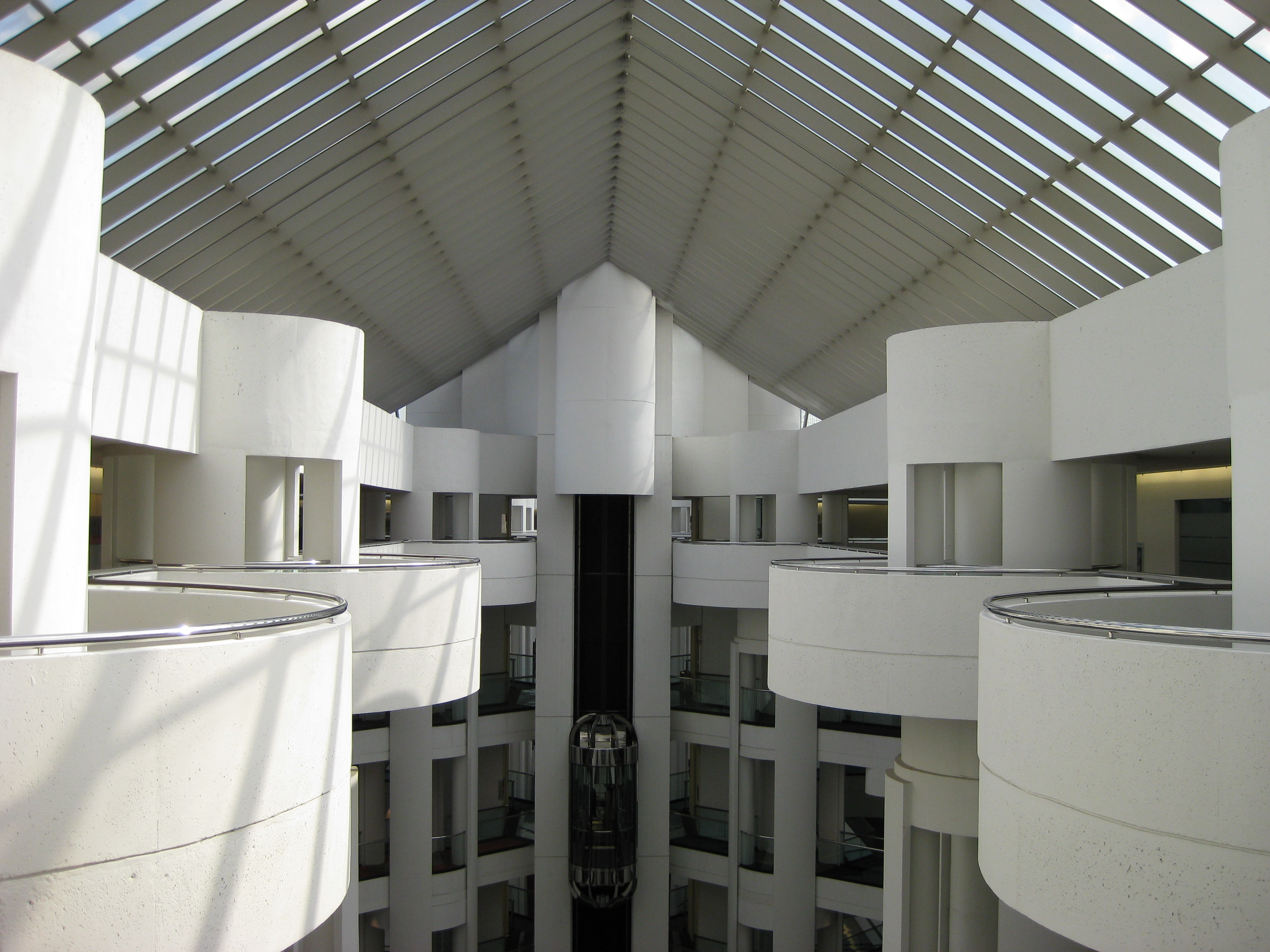
Interior view from top floor, looking at ceiling and upper floors

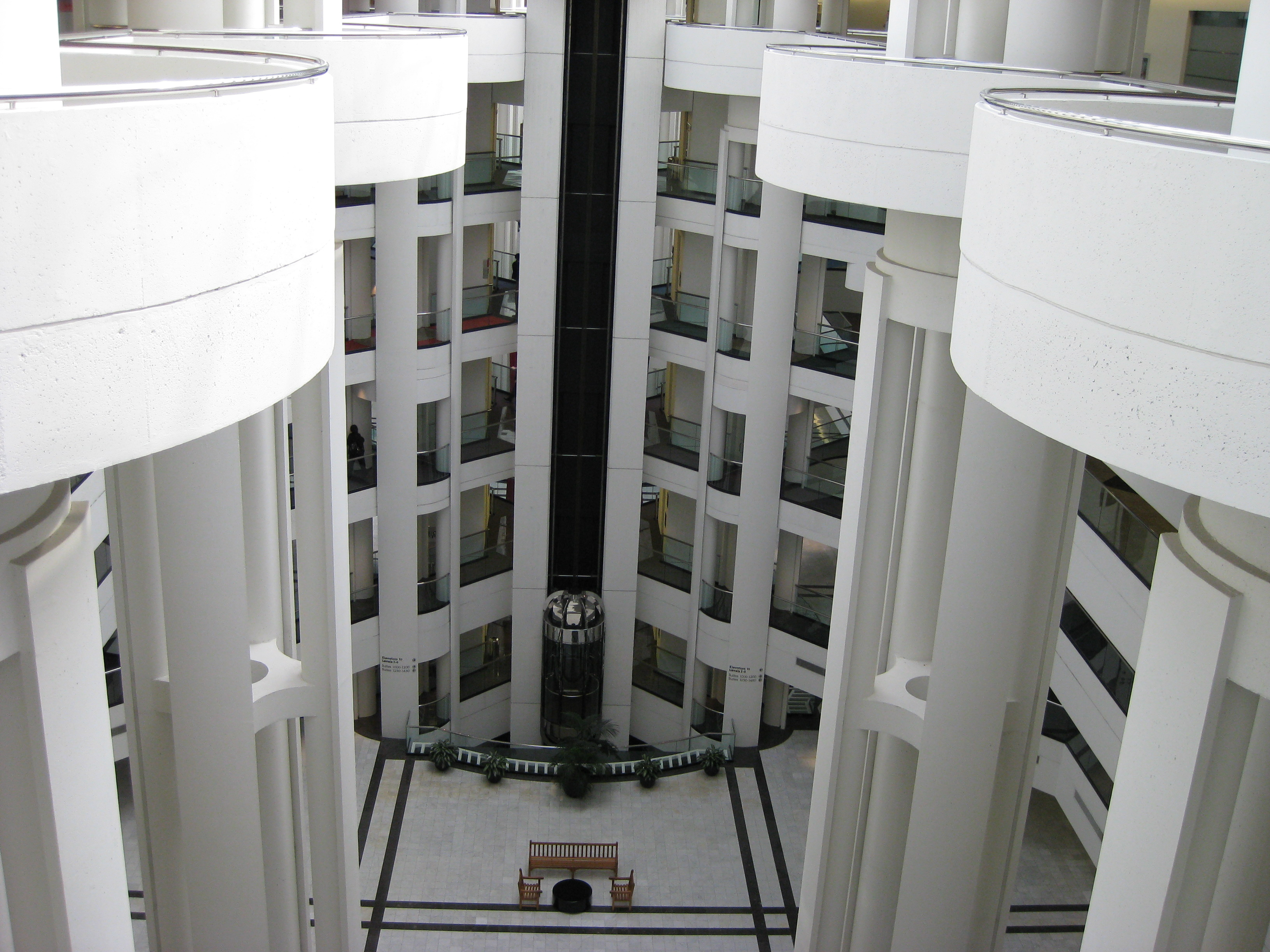
Interior view, looking down from top floor

The lower levels (Ground and Mezzanine) consist of meeting and conference rooms, a few business offices, and a 450-seat, two-level theater. The Bridge level (with 22-foot (6.7 m) high ceiling), above Mezzanine, houses Park View Café, a cafeteria-style breakfast and lunch restaurant, and Internap. The Bridge level was originally named Expo, and consisted mostly of convention floor space, requiring a very high ceiling. Most of that space, including the inactive passenger bridge, is now leased by Internap, housing telecommunications equipment and office space. Six floors of office space sit above Bridge, spanning only part of the building's north-to-south distance. Office floor 1 is also named Atrium.

The building provides a set of escalators between Ground, Mezzanine, Bridge, and Atrium and an additional two sets of escalators from the Atrium level to the office floor 6. Most of the latter exit onto floors with locked doors into office suites. Two sets of four passenger elevators connect all floors: one set travels from underground parking (levels A–D) up through Atrium, and the second from Atrium to office floor 6. The secondary elevators actually begin at the Bridge level, but since the change from Expo to office space, that level is now disabled in the secondary elevators and inaccessible except through a service door inside the Internap offices. Three service elevators span the entire building from loading docks (at level with underground parking) through office level 6.
