= John C. Portman Jr. =

American architect (1924–2017)

- Born: John Calvin Portman Jr. December 4, 1924; Walhalla, South Carolina, U.S.
- Died: December 29, 2017 (aged 93); Atlanta, Georgia, U.S.
- Occupation: Architect
- Children: 6
- Relatives: Traylor Howard (daughter-in-law)
- Awards: AIA Medal for Innovations in Hotel Design; AIA Silver Medal Award for Innovative Design; Urban Land Institute Award for Excellence
- Practice: John Portman & Associates

John Calvin Portman Jr. (December 4, 1924 – December 29, 2017) was an American neofuturistic architect and real estate developer widely known for popularizing hotels and office buildings with multi-storied interior atria. Portman also had a particularly large impact on the cityscape of his hometown of Atlanta, with the Peachtree Center complex serving as downtown's business and tourism anchor from the 1970s onward. The Peachtree Center area includes Portman-designed Hyatt, Westin, and Marriott hotels. Portman's plans typically dealt with primitives in the forms of symmetrical squares and circles.

== Early life and career ==
Portman was born on December 4, 1924, in Walhalla, South Carolina, to John C. Portman Sr. and Edna Rochester Portman. He had five sisters. He graduated from the Georgia Institute of Technology in 1950. His firm completed the Merchandise Mart (now AmericasMart) in downtown Atlanta in 1961. The multi-block Peachtree Center was begun in 1965 and would expand to become the main center of hotel and office space in Downtown Atlanta, taking over from the Five Points area just to the south. Portman would develop a similar multiblock complex at San Francisco's Embarcadero Center (1970s), which unlike its Atlanta counterpart, heavily emphasized pedestrian activity at street level.

The Hyatt Regency Atlanta, Portman's first atrium hotel, would lead to many more iconic hotels and multi-use complexes with atria, including the Westin Bonaventure Hotel in Los Angeles (1974–1976), the New York Marriott Marquis (1982–1985), and the Renaissance Center in Detroit (first phase 1973–1977), whose central tower remained the tallest hotel in the Western Hemisphere until the completion of 1717 Broadway in 2013.

His signature work in China, the Shanghai Centre (1990), was the first of many major projects in China and elsewhere in Asia. The 5-star hotel inside, The Portman Ritz-Carlton, Shanghai (formerly Portman Shangri-La Hotel), was named after him.

In 2009, Portman's work was featured in a major exhibition at Atlanta's High Museum of Art.

Portman was a Fellow of the American Institute of Architects.

== Personal life and death ==
Portman married Joan "Jan" Newton. They had six children.

Portman died on December 29, 2017, aged 93, in Atlanta. Through his son Jarel, his daughter-in-law is actress Traylor Howard.

== Portfolio ==
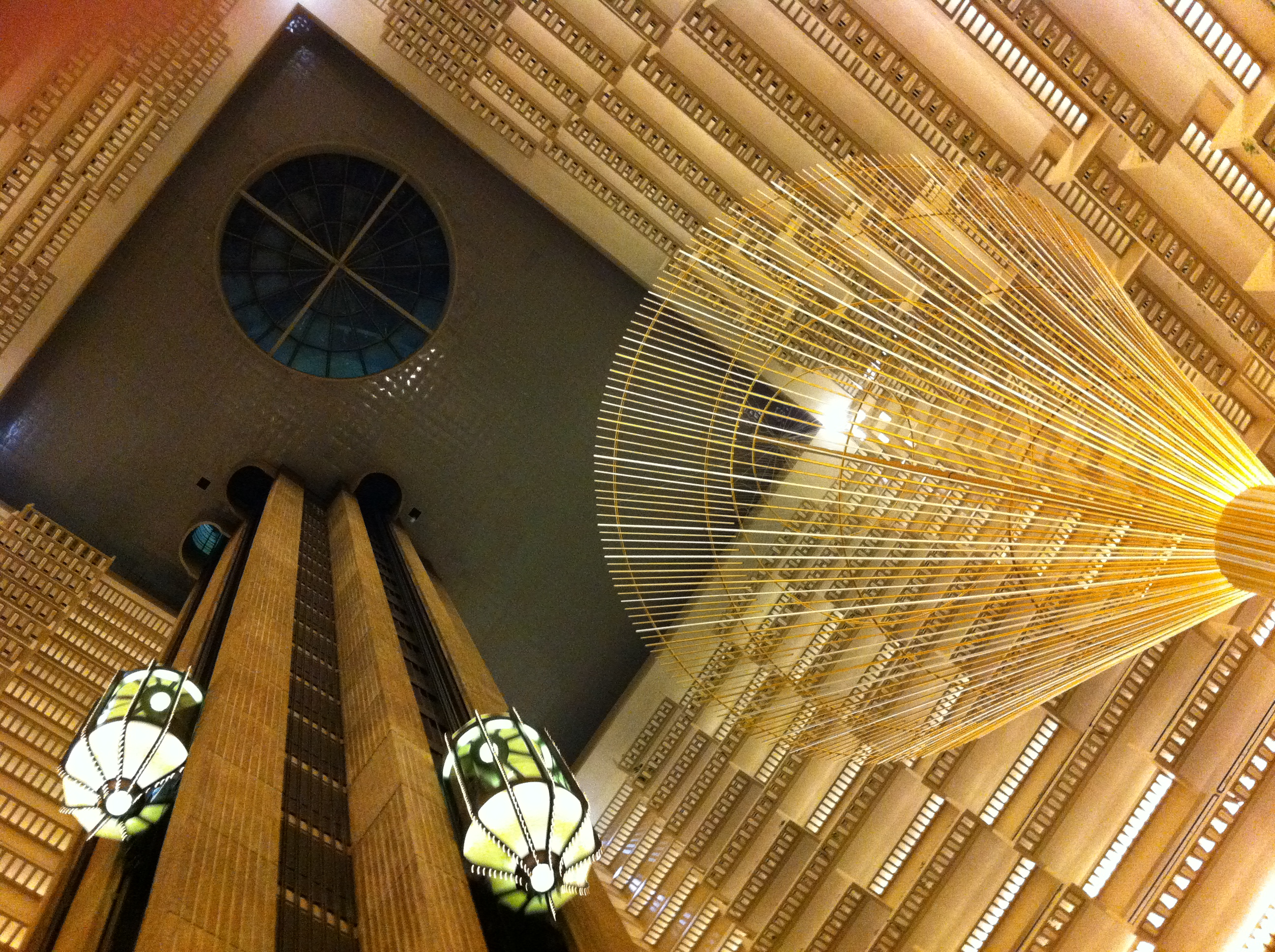
Looking up into atrium of the Hyatt Regency Atlanta, first of Portman's atrium hotels

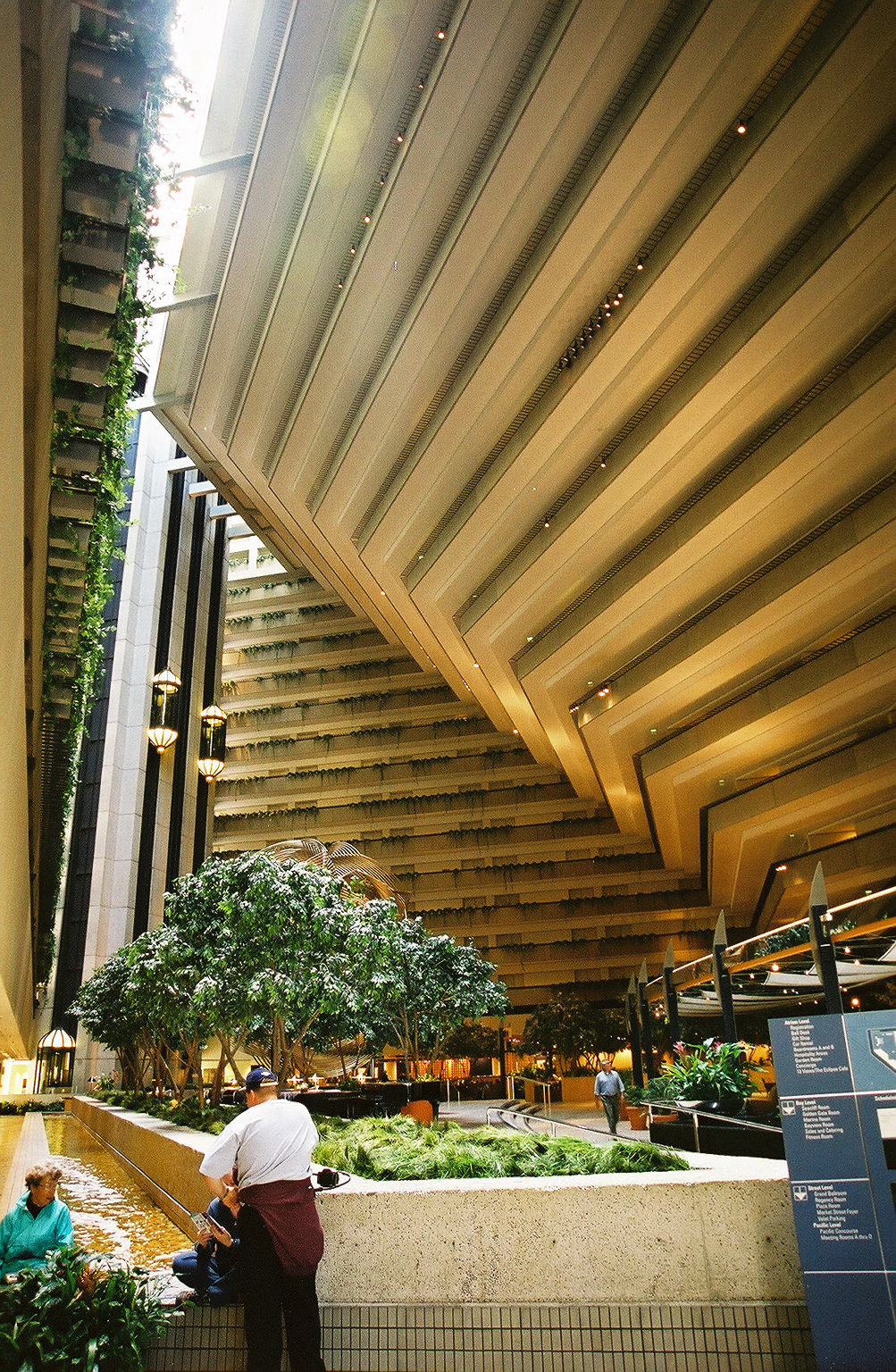
Embarcadero Hyatt Atrium, San Francisco

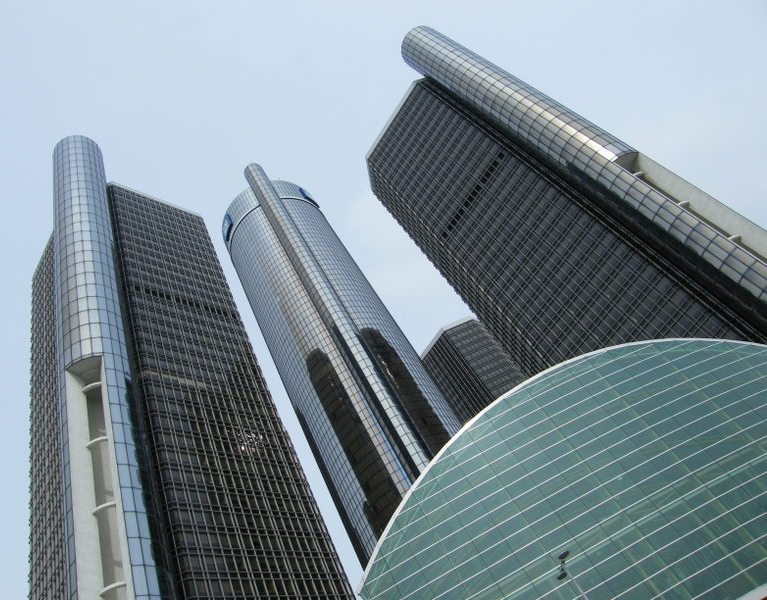
Renaissance Center, Detroit, MI

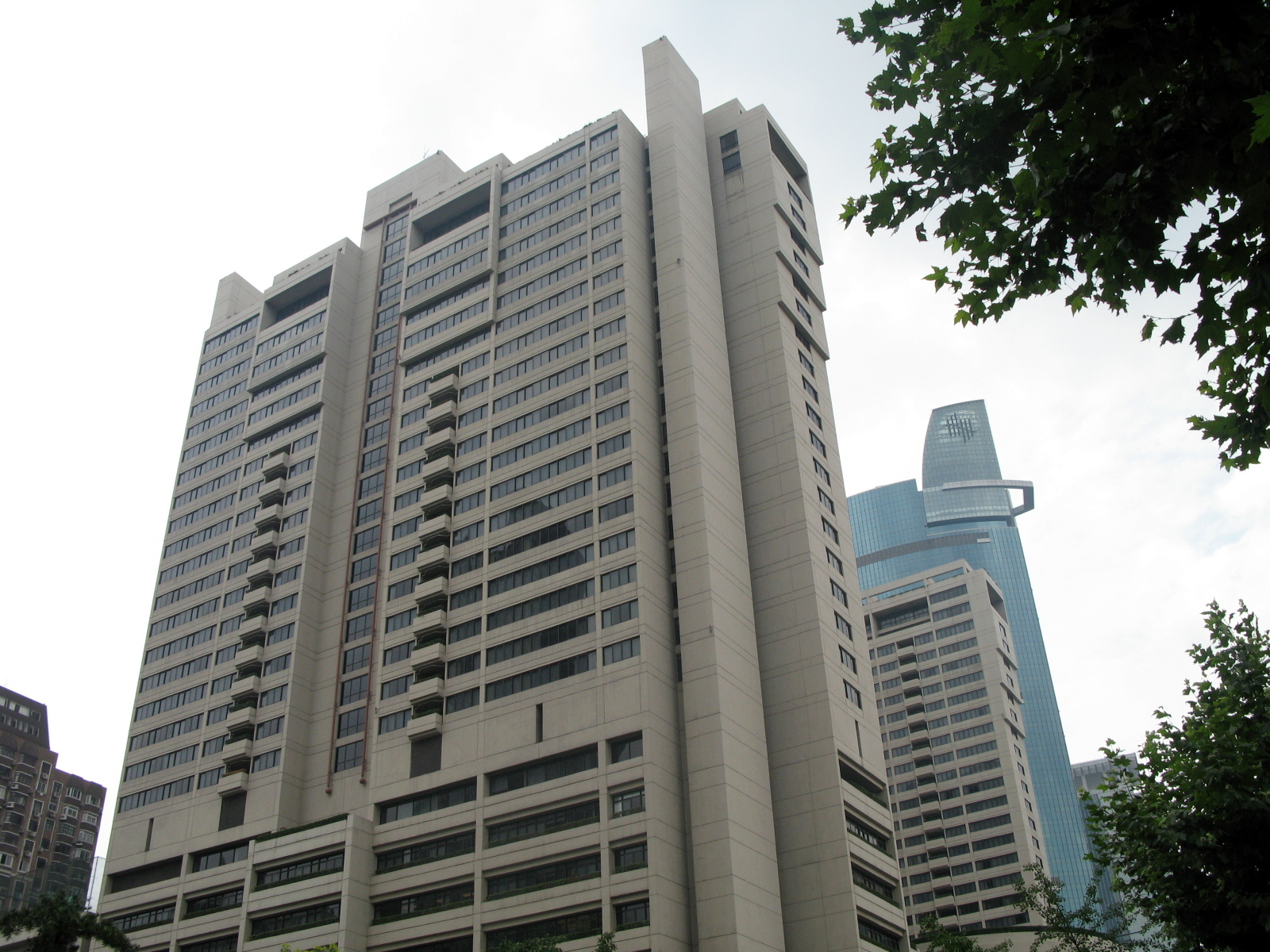
Shanghai Centre

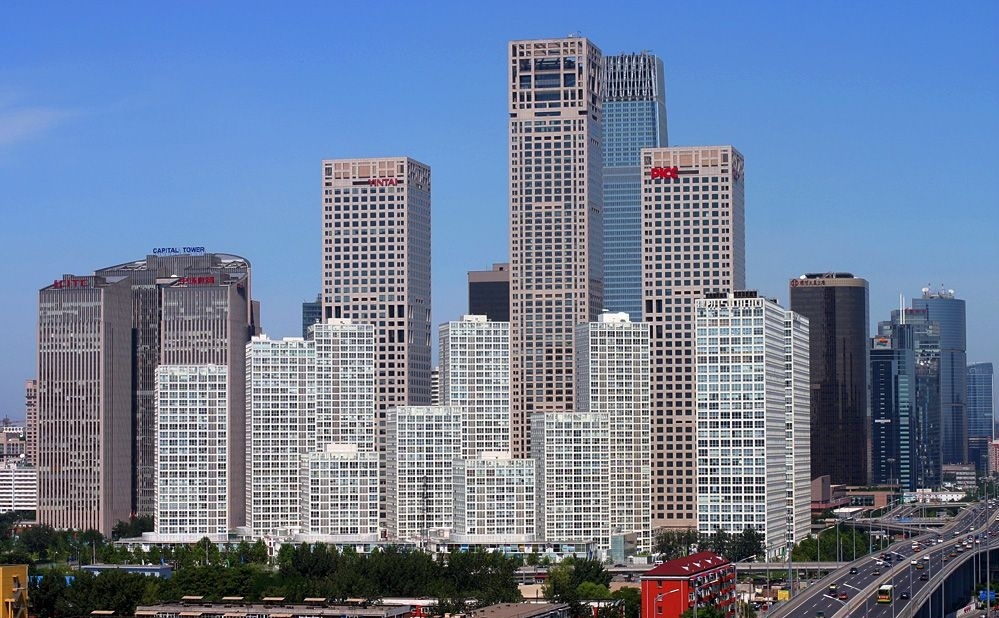
Beijing Yintai Centre

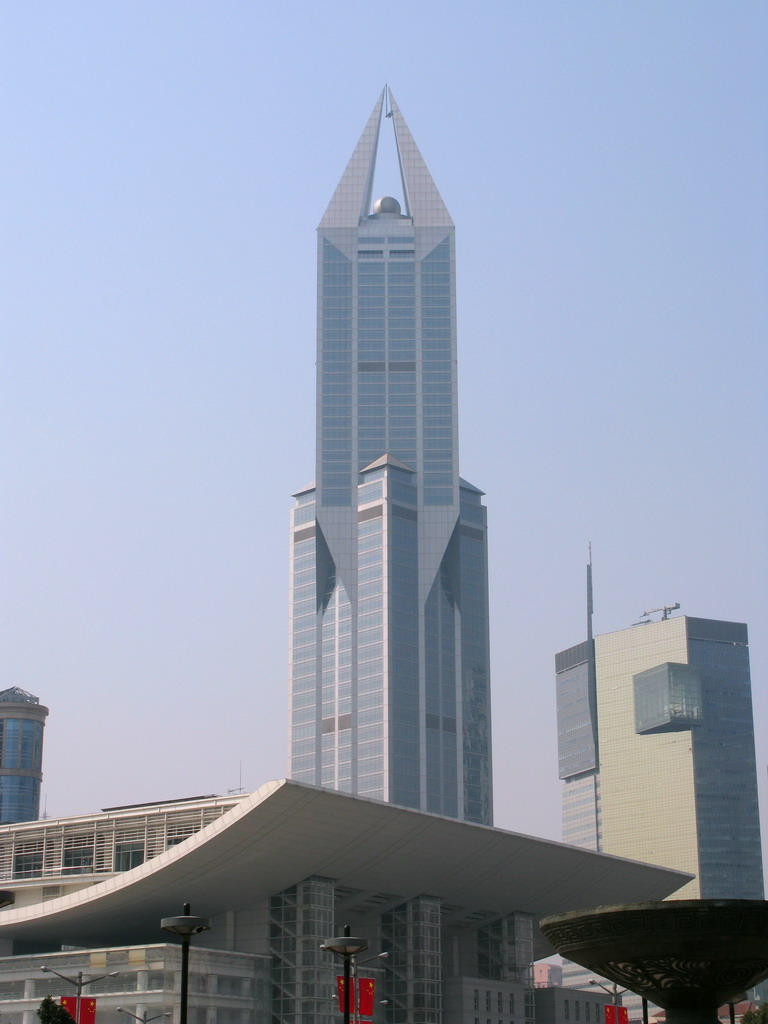
Tomorrow Square, Shanghai

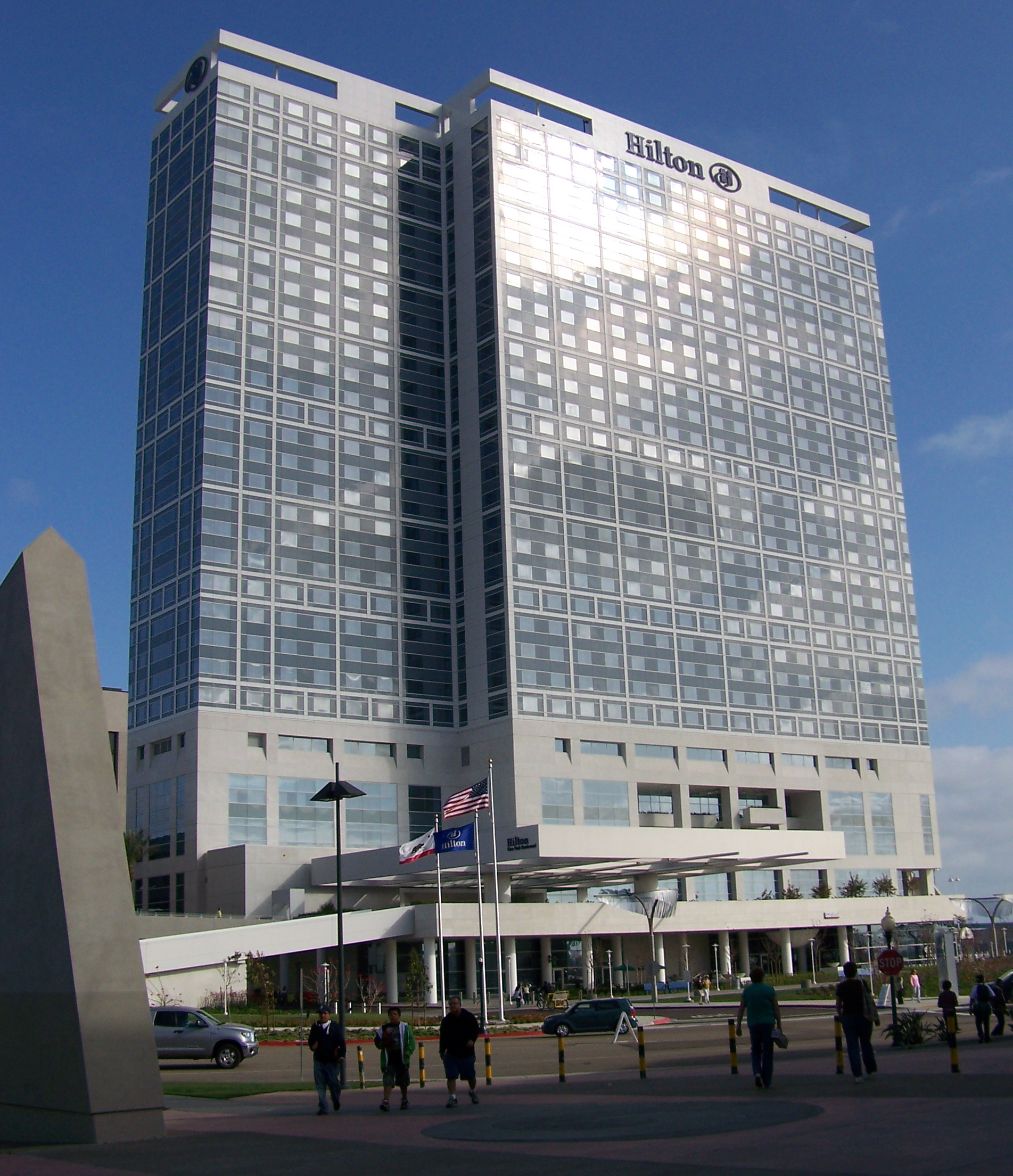
Hilton San Diego Bayfront

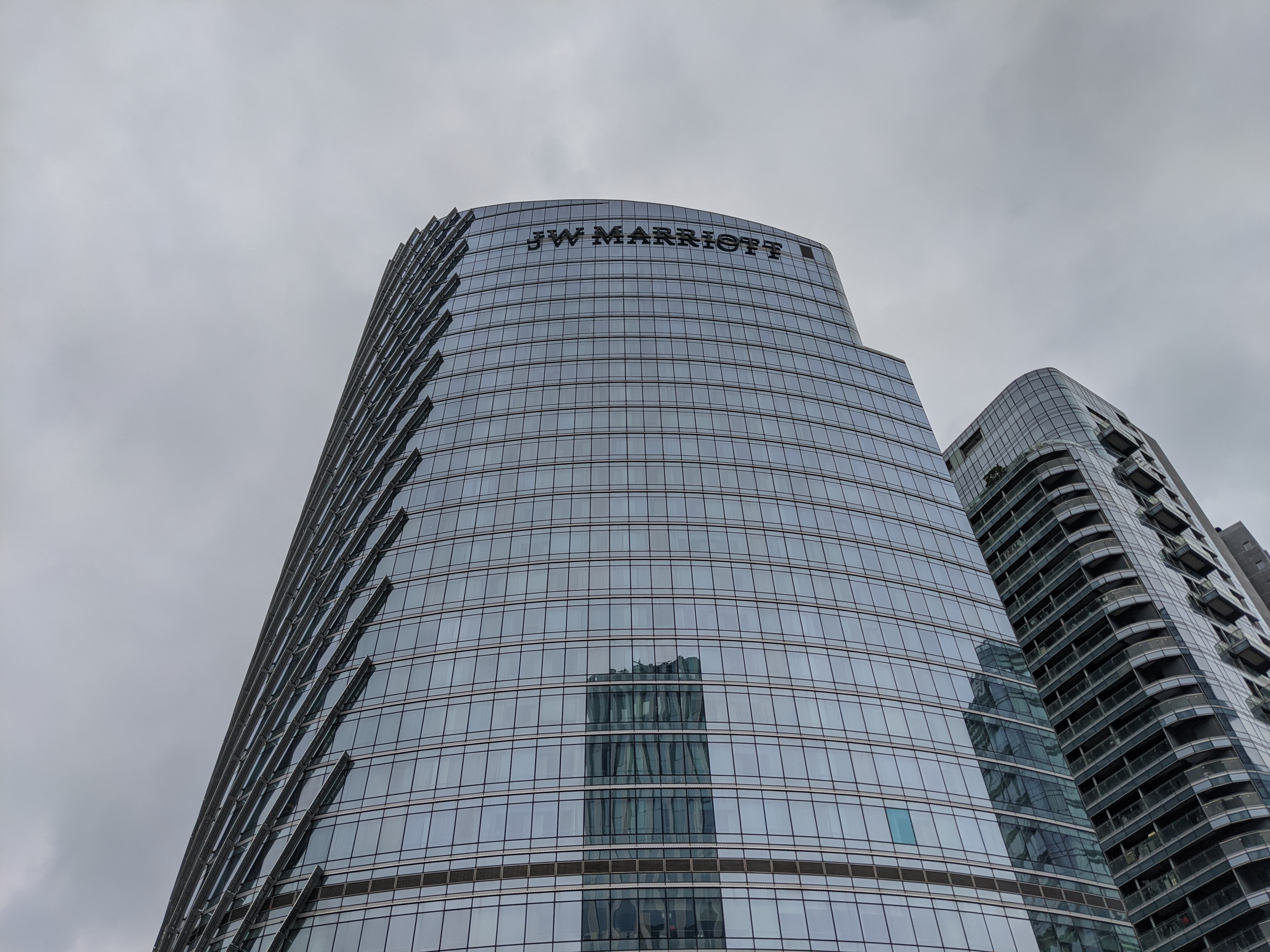
JW Marriott Hotel Shenzhen Bao'an, Shenzhen

In chronological order by first listed completion date — for complexes, by completion date of first building in complex

An asterisk (*) following a listing indicates a work done in partnership with H. Griffith Edwards.

=== 1960s ===
- AmericasMart (formerly the Atlanta Market Center), Atlanta
  - AmericasMart 1 (also known as the Merchandise Mart), 1961*
  - AmericasMart 2 (also known as the Gift Mart), 1992
  - AmericasMart 2 West, 2008
  - AmericasMart 3 (also known as the Apparel Mart), 1979
- Atlanta Decorative Arts Center (ADAC), Peachtree Hills, Atlanta, 1961
- Cary Reynolds Elementary (formerly Sequoyah Elementary and Northwoods Area Elementary before that), Brookhaven, 1961
- Sequoyah Middle School (formerly Sequoyah High School), 1963
- 230 Peachtree Building (formerly the Peachtree Center Tower), Atlanta, 1965*
- Antoine Graves, Atlanta, 1965*
- Antoine Graves Annex, Atlanta, 1966*
- Spalding Drive Elementary School, Sandy Springs, Georgia, 1966*
- Henderson High School, Chamblee, 1967*
- Peachtree Center, Atlanta
  - Peachtree Center North (formerly the Atlanta Gas Light Tower), 1967*
  - Peachtree Center South, 1969
  - Peachtree Center International Tower (formerly the Peachtree Cain Building), 1972*
  - Harris Tower, 1975*
  - Marquis One, 1985
  - Marquis Two, 1989
- Hyatt Regency Atlanta (formerly the Regency Hyatt House), 1967*
- Hyatt Regency O'Hare, Rosemont, 1969

=== 1970s ===
- BlueCross BlueShield of Tennessee (now The Westin Chattanooga Hotel), Chattanooga, 1971
- Embarcadero Center, San Francisco
  - One Embarcadero Center (formerly the Security Pacific Tower), 1971
  - Two Embarcadero Center, 1974
  - Three Embarcadero Center (formerly the Levi Strauss Building), 1977
  - Four Embarcadero Center, 1982
  - Hyatt Regency San Francisco (also known as Five Embarcadero Center), 1973
  - Embarcadero West, 1989
  - Le Méridien San Francisco (formerly the Park Hyatt San Francisco), 1988
- The Mall at Peachtree Center, Atlanta, 1973
- The Tower (formerly the Block 82 Tower, Bank One Tower, Team Bank, Texas American Bank, and Fort Worth National Bank Building), Fort Worth, 1969–1974
- Westin Peachtree Plaza Hotel, Atlanta, 1976
- Westin Bonaventure Hotel, Los Angeles, 1974–1976
- Renaissance Center, Detroit
  - Detroit Marriott at the Renaissance Center (formerly the Detroit Plaza Hotel, The Westin Hotel Renaissance Center Detroit), 1973–1977
  - Renaissance Center Tower 100, 1973–1977
  - Renaissance Center Tower 200, 1973–1977
  - Renaissance Center Tower 300, 1973–1977
  - Renaissance Center Tower 400, 1973–1977
  - Renaissance Center Tower 500, 1979–1981
  - Renaissance Center Tower 600, 1979–1981

=== 1980s ===
- The Regent Singapore (formerly the Pavilion InterContinental Hotel), Singapore, 1982
- George W. Woodruff Physical Education Center, Emory University, 1983
- Peachtree Center Athletic Club, Atlanta, 1985
- Atlanta Marriott Marquis, 1985
- Hyatt Regency Jeju, Jungmun, Jeju-do, South Korea, 1985
- Marina Square, Singapore
  - Marina Square Shopping Centre, 1985
  - Mandarin Oriental Singapore, 1985
  - Marina Mandarin Singapore, 1985
  - The Pan Pacific Singapore, 1986
- Entelechy II, Sea Island, 1986
- New York Marriott Marquis, New York City, 1982–1985
- R. Howard Dobbs University Center, Emory University, 1986 (demolished)
- Northpark Town Center, Sandy Springs
  - Northpark 400, 1986
  - Northpark 500, 1989
  - Northpark 600, 1998
- JW Marriott San Francisco Union Square (formerly the Pan Pacific San Francisco and Portman Hotel), 1987
- American Cancer Society Center (formerly the Inforum Technology Center), Atlanta, 1989
- Riverwood 100 (formerly the Barnett Bank Building), Vinings, 1989

=== 1990s ===
- Shanghai Centre, Shanghai, China, 1990
  - Shanghai Centre West Apartment (also known as the Exhibition Centre North Apartment 1)
  - Shanghai Centre Apartments 2 (also known as the Shanghai East Apartment)
  - The Portman Ritz-Carlton, Shanghai (formerly the Shanghai Centre Main Tower and Portman Shangri-La Hotel)
- Truist Plaza (formerly One Peachtree Center), Atlanta, 1992
- Cap Square (short for Capital Square), Kuala Lumpur, Malaysia
  - Menara Multi Purpose (also known as the Capital Square Tower 1), 1994
  - Capital Square Condominiums, 2007

=== 2000s ===
- Bank of Communications, Shanghai, China, 2000
- Shi Liu Pu Building (also known as the Bank of Telecommunications), Shanghai, China, 2000
- Bund Center, Shanghai, China, 2002
  - Bund Center (also known as the Shanghai Golden Beach Tower)
  - The Westin Bund Center, Shanghai
  - Westin Residences
- Westin Warsaw Hotel, Warsaw, Poland, 2001–2003
- Beijing Yintai Centre (also known as the Silvertie Center), Beijing, China, 2002–2007
  - Beijing Yintai Centre Tower 1
  - Beijing Yintai Centre Tower 2
  - Beijing Yintai Centre Tower 3
- The Westin Charlotte, Charlotte, 2003
- Tomorrow Square (contains the JW Marriott Hotel Shanghai at Tomorrow Square), Shanghai, China, 1997–2003
- Taj Wellington Mews Luxury Residences, Mumbai, India, 2004
- Renaissance Schaumburg Convention Center Hotel, Schaumburg, 2006
- ICON, San Diego, 2004–2007
- Hilton San Diego Bayfront (also known as the Hilton San Diego Convention Center Hotel and Campbell Shipyard Hilton), San Diego, 2006–2008

=== 2010s ===
- JW Marriott Hotel Shenzhen Bao'an, Shenzhen, China, 2015
- CODA Tech Square, Atlanta, 2017

== Awards and honors ==
- 1968 Golden Plate Award of the American Academy of Achievement
- 1978 Medal for Innovations in Hotel Design – American Institute of Architects
- 1980 Silver Medal Award for Innovative Design – American Institute of Architects, Atlanta Chapter
- 1984 Urban Land Institute Award for Excellence – for Embarcadero Center
- 2009 The Lynn S. Beedle Lifetime Achievement Award – Council on Tall Buildings and Urban Habitat
- 2011 The Atlanta City Council renamed Harris Street in Downtown Atlanta as John Portman Boulevard at Historic Harris Street.
- 2013 Four Pillar Award – Council for Quality Growth

== Criticism ==
Portman was praised for his "cinematic" interiors artfully relating interior space and elements to the individual. In the 1960s and 1970s the placement of such buildings in America's decaying downtowns was considered salvation of the city centers, but some contemporary city planners are critical of such insular environments that "turn their back" on the city streets. For example, the New York Marriott Marquis with its 8-floor high lobby was praised as a "town square", but is now criticized by some for turning its back to Times Square. Nonetheless, at the time the hotel was built, due to the still-seedy character of Times Square, Portman's style of inwardly-oriented spaces made logical sense. Also, he did, in fact, design buildings (like San Francisco's Embarcadero Center) that heavily emphasized pedestrian activity at street level.

== Bibliography ==
- Portman, John; Barnett, Jonathan (1976). The Architect as Developer. McGraw Hill. ISBN 0-07-050536-5.
