= Hilton San Diego Bayfront =

Hotel in San Diego, California

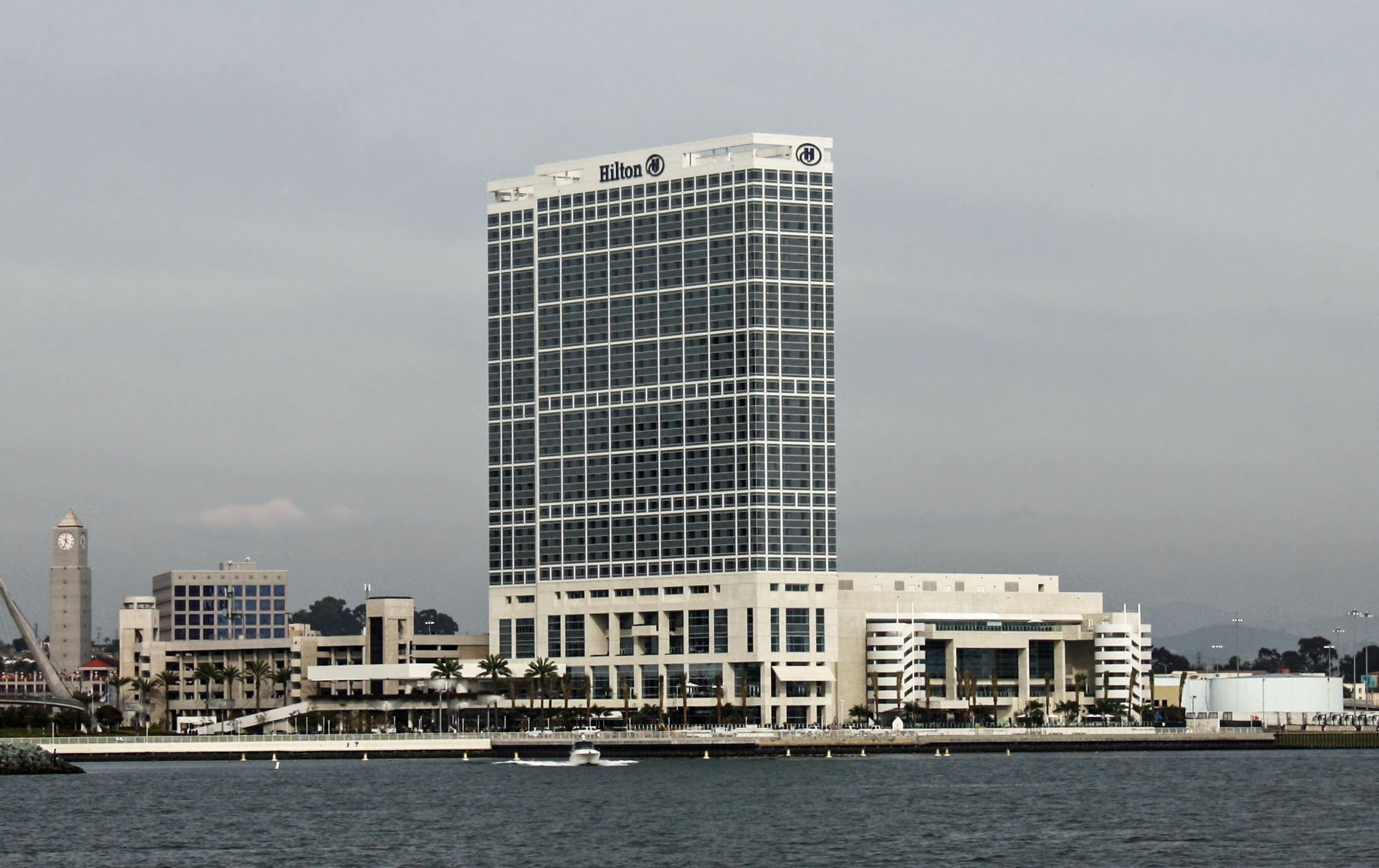
- Interactive map of the Hilton San Diego Bayfront area

General information
- Location: 1 Park Boulevard; San Diego, California
- Coordinates: 32.7033°N 117.1587°W
- Opening: December 3, 2008
- Cost: US$348 million
- Operator: Hilton Worldwide

Height
- Height: 117.35 m (385.0 ft)

Technical details
- Floor count: 30
- Floor area: 165,000 sq ft (15,300 m^{2})

Design and construction
- Architect: John Portman & Associates

Other information
- Number of rooms: 1,190
- Number of suites: 44
- Number of restaurants: Odysea; The Pool Club; Vela; Starbucks; Sweet Things
- Parking: 2,000 car, $26 million garage

Hilton San Diego Bayfront is a hotel in San Diego, California. The 30-story structure is 385 ft-tall (117 m), containing 1,190 suites. The modern building, designed by John Portman & Associates, is located in the Marina district of downtown San Diego, directly adjacent to the San Diego Convention Center along San Diego Bay.

Hilton Worldwide fully owned and operated the hotel until 2011 when the company sold 75% of the building to Sunstone Hotels, maintaining 25% of the ownership at a cash value of $475 million. Hilton Worldwide remains the sole corporate operator of the property.

== History ==
On May 19, 2008, a natural gas leak caused an explosion that injured fourteen construction workers, damaging four floors on the unfinished hotel. About four hundred construction workers were on site at the time of the explosion. The construction company, Hensel Phelps, was also responsible for rebuilding sections of the Pentagon after the September 11 attacks.

During the summer of 2019, the hotel underwent a $23 million renovation to guest rooms, suites, and corridors.

On July 20, 2022, Hilton employees walked off the job. A new deal was signed four days later, on July 24. Bridgette Browning, President of UNITE HERE Local 30, said after the deal was signed that "the overwhelming approval of this contract shows how much it will help our members during these difficult economic times", emphasizing that "front-line tourism workers power our economy, and this contract is a step toward acknowledging the true value they provide our city."

On December 13, 2023, a 31-year-old man was shot in the hotel's parking structure.

== See also ==
- List of tallest buildings in San Diego
- List of largest hotels in the world
