= Antoine Graves (building) =

Coordinates: 33.7514°N 84.3761°W

The Antoine Graves building was a midrise public housing project intended for senior citizens in Atlanta, Georgia. Built in 1965, the building was located at 126 SE Hilliard St. After sustaining tornado damage in 2008, the main highrise and its annex were demolished the following year.

The Antoine Graves building was one of the earliest and most influential designs by architect John C. Portman Jr. It was his first atrium building and only public housing project. He adapted its atrium design in 1967 for the Hyatt Regency Atlanta, a building which brought Portman international fame.

When demolition plans were announced, Portman pleaded to save the building, to no avail. The building had been damaged in the 2008 tornado and according to the Atlanta Housing Authority was "functionally obsolete" with "tiny rooms" and containing asbestos.

== Namesake ==
The highrise was named after Antoine Graves (1862–1941), a prominent realtor, first principal of Gate City Public School (1884–1886), and principal at the Storrs School, the first school in Atlanta for blacks.
