= Antoine Graves =

American realtor and school administrator

Antoine Graves (1862–1941) was a prominent Atlanta realtor, first principal of Gate City Colored Public School (1884–1886), and principal at the Storrs School, the first school in Atlanta for blacks. He had his real estate offices in the Kimball Building on Wall Street, a street otherwise totally occupied by whites. He brokered the deal for the sale of the land where the Georgia State Capitol now stands. His is the only mausoleum in the black section of Oakland Cemetery.

When principal of Gate City Colored Public School, Jefferson Davis's body passed in front of the school on the way to Richmond, Virginia for burial. Schools were ordered to close that day so everyone could attend the memorial parade, but Graves refused to honor a man who fought for slavery. Graves was fired as a result of this refusal.

His wife Catherine Webb was the daughter of Sinai Calhoun Webb, born a slave in 1830 and the biracial daughter of prominent Southern politician and mayor of Atlanta Judge William Ezzard.

The Atlanta Housing Authority's Antoine Graves senior citizen highrise (built 1965, demolished 2009) was named after him.
