= Shanghai Centre =

Building complex in Shanghai, China

Coordinates: 31°13′43″N 121°26′49″E

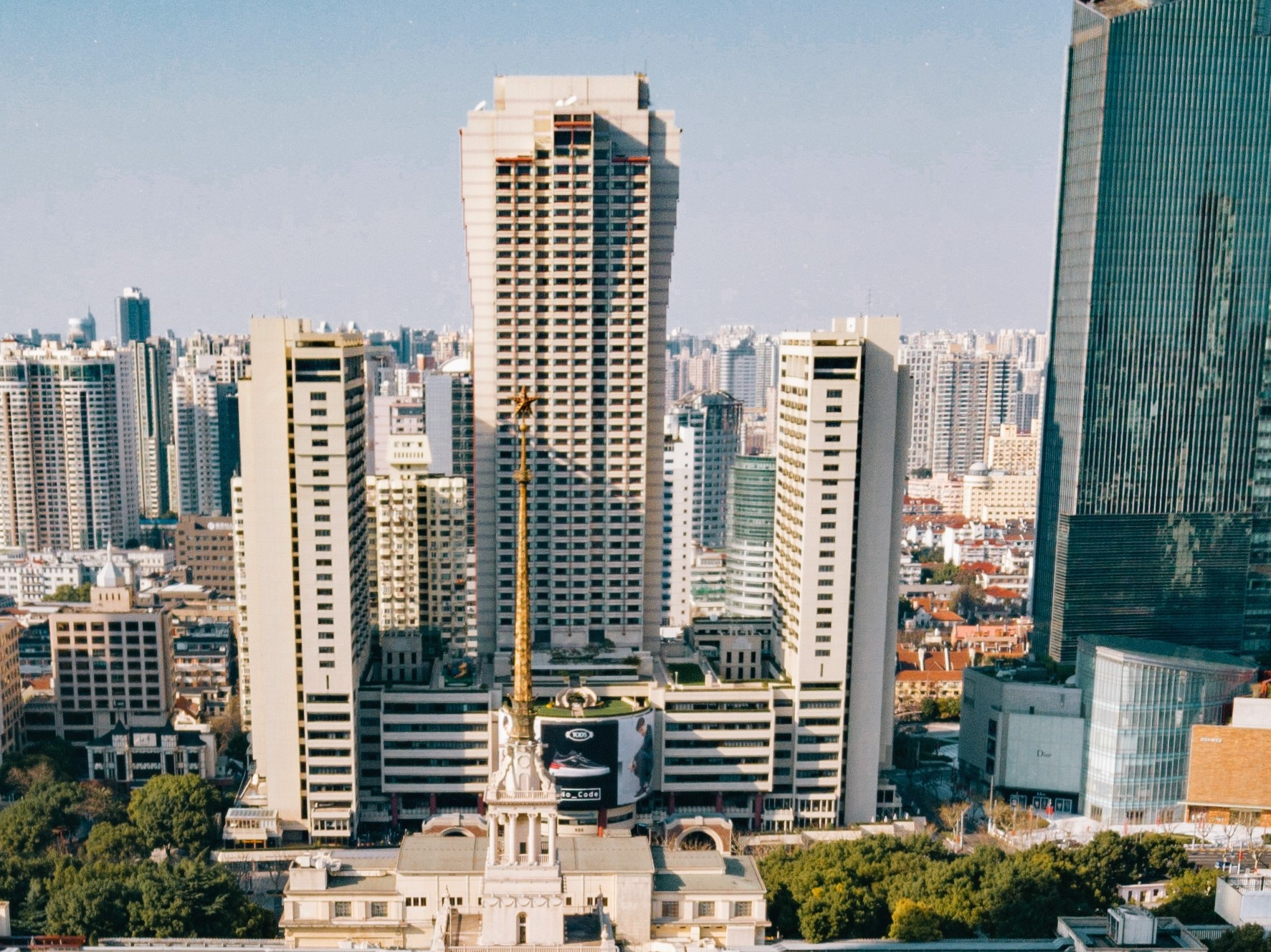
- Interactive map of the Shanghai Centre area

General information
- Location: Shanghai, China

Design and construction
- Architect: John Calvin Portman Jr.

Shanghai Centre (Chinese: 上海商城; pinyin: Shànghǎi Shāngchéng) is located on West Nanjing Road, Jing'an District, Shanghai. It is a comprehensive building complex consisting of three towers rising from an eight-storey base. Designed by John C. Portman Jr., the Shanghai Centre was one of the first contemporary skyscrapers to be built in Shanghai. It occupies a prestige location, across West Nanjing Road from the Russian neo-classical style Shanghai Exhibition Centre complex, with whose central axis the Shanghai Centre's central axis is aligned.

The whole complex hosts 472 apartment units, 30,000 sq. meters of high-end office area, a supermarket, three stories of luxury department stores, the Shanghai Centre Theatre, a Trading Exhibition Centre, and a 5-star hotel (The Portman Ritz Carlton Shanghai, named after the architect).

The complex opened in April 1990, and it consists of three towers and several accessory buildings. The eight-storey pedestal building fronts onto West Nanjing Road. The building's frontage is not aligned with the street: in order to align the central axis with that of the Shanghai Exhibition Centre on the other side of West Nanjing Road (the main frontage of which in turn faces, and therefore is aligned with, Yan'an Road), the Shanghai Centre was built at an angle to West Nanjing Road. The three towers are arranged symmetrically "rising" out of the pedestal: one at the centre and towards the back, and two symmetrically to the left and right, further to the front. The three towers have similar profiles, with a memorable feature being a slight widening of the long side of each tower towards the top, giving each tower a profile reminiscent of traditional Chinese monumental stelae or towers.

== Tenants ==
The building also hosts a number of foreign consulates or their delegate offices, including Australia, Brazil, Canada, Costa Rica, Ireland, the Philippines and the United States. The Consulate-General of the United States in Shanghai has some satellite offices in the Shanghai Centre.

At one point Northwest Airlines operated a ticket office in Suite 207. Delta Air Lines, which merged with Northwest, moved the ticket office to the Kerry Centre. At one time All Nippon Airways set its Shanghai sales office in Suite 808 of Shanghai Centre.
