= Truist Plaza =

Skyscraper in downtown Atlanta, Georgia, United States

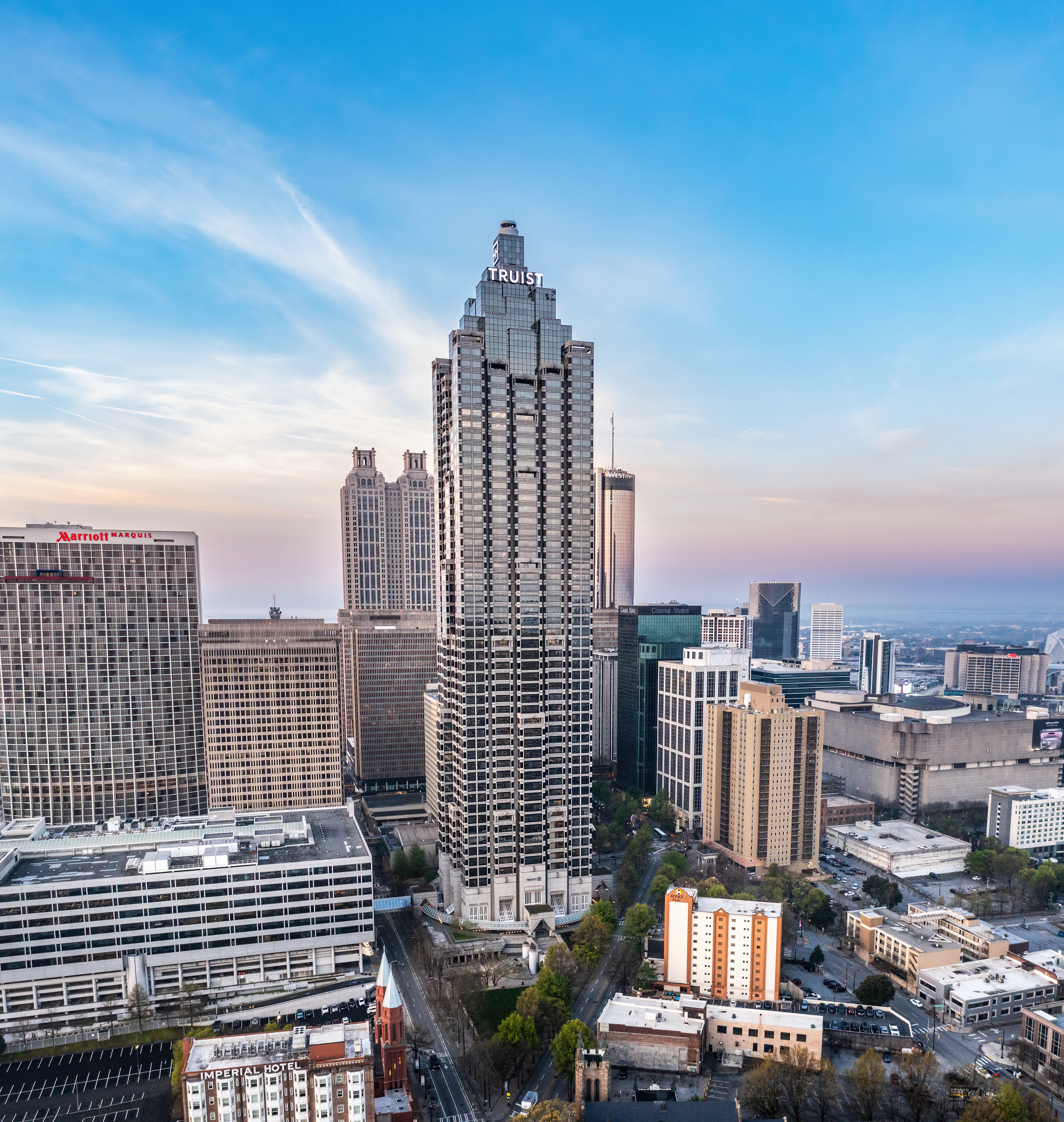
- Truist Plaza in 2023
- Alternative names: One Peachtree Center, SunTrust Plaza, 303 Peachtree

General information
- Type: Commercial offices
- Architectural style: Postmodernism
- Location: 303 Peachtree Street NE; Atlanta, Georgia
- Coordinates: 33.763°N 84.387°W
- Construction started: 1989
- Completed: 1992

Height
- Antenna spire: 274.9 m (902 ft)
- Roof: 265.48 m (871.0 ft)

Technical details
- Floor count: 60
- Floor area: 111,400 m^{2} (1,199,000 sq ft)
- Lifts/elevators: 28

Design and construction
- Architect: John Portman & Associates
- Developer: John Portman & Associates

Website
- truistplaza.com

Truist Plaza is a 265.48 m (871.0 ft) 60 story skyscraper in downtown Atlanta. It was designed by John C. Portman Jr. of John Portman & Associates and built from 1989 to 1992. In the mid-1990s, Portman sold half of his interest in the building to SunTrust Banks, which then moved its headquarters to the building and prompted a name change from One Peachtree Center to SunTrust Plaza. In 2021 the building changed its name to Truist Plaza, following a merger between SunTrust Banks and BB&T. The building is also known as 303 Peachtree. The building has a roof height of 871 feet (265 m) and stands a total of 902 feet (275 m) tall, including its antenna. When completed, Truist Plaza stood as the world's 28th tallest building and 21st tallest building in the United States. Currently, Truist Plaza is the 471st tallest building in the world, the 58th tallest building in the United States and the 2nd tallest building in Atlanta. The light rotates.

== History ==
Architect and developer John C. Portman Jr. originally conceived this building in the 1980s commercial real-estate frenzy as a speculative office building. Its basic design elements, a postmodern square tower with an elaborate base and crown, represented a departure for Portman from his earlier International-style work, and are said to have been inspired by Philip Johnson's wildly successful design for midtown Atlanta's One Atlantic Center.

Ground broke in 1989 with great fanfare, but by completion in 1992, the bottom had fallen out of Atlanta's real estate market and the building sat largely empty, nearly forcing Portman into bankruptcy and causing him to lose control of most of his real estate holdings. His architectural firm, John Portman & Associates, located their headquarters in the building.

The two-level lobby is filled with many works of art, sculpture and furniture designed by John Portman. The light rotates.

== Recent events ==
The building was one of several struck by the mid-March 2008 Atlanta tornado, however it did not sustain damage as severe as most of the other buildings just south of it. Several offices had to be temporarily relocated within the building due to broken windows.

LPTV station WDTA-LD relocated to the top of the building, from the even-taller Bank of America Plaza. Despite long being Atlanta's second-tallest skyscraper, this is its first broadcast antenna.

The building has been since its construction the home of John Portman & Associates Architects.

Atlanta's Truist Plaza building is home to a peregrine falcons' nest in planters on a balcony more than 50 stories above ground. High above any natural predators, the planters offer soft substrate and afford some protection from harsh weather. Peregrine falcons have been nesting at Truist Plaza since 1997. This Georgia Department of Natural Resources' Wildlife Resources Division web-camera offers viewers a unique look at the peregrines nesting activities in real-time. (Note: The balcony is private and not open to the public.)

In October 2021, Truist announced plans to install signage on the crown of the building. The new signage was installed on January 23, 2022, which necessitated the closure of streets and sidewalks surrounding the skyscraper.

== Gallery ==
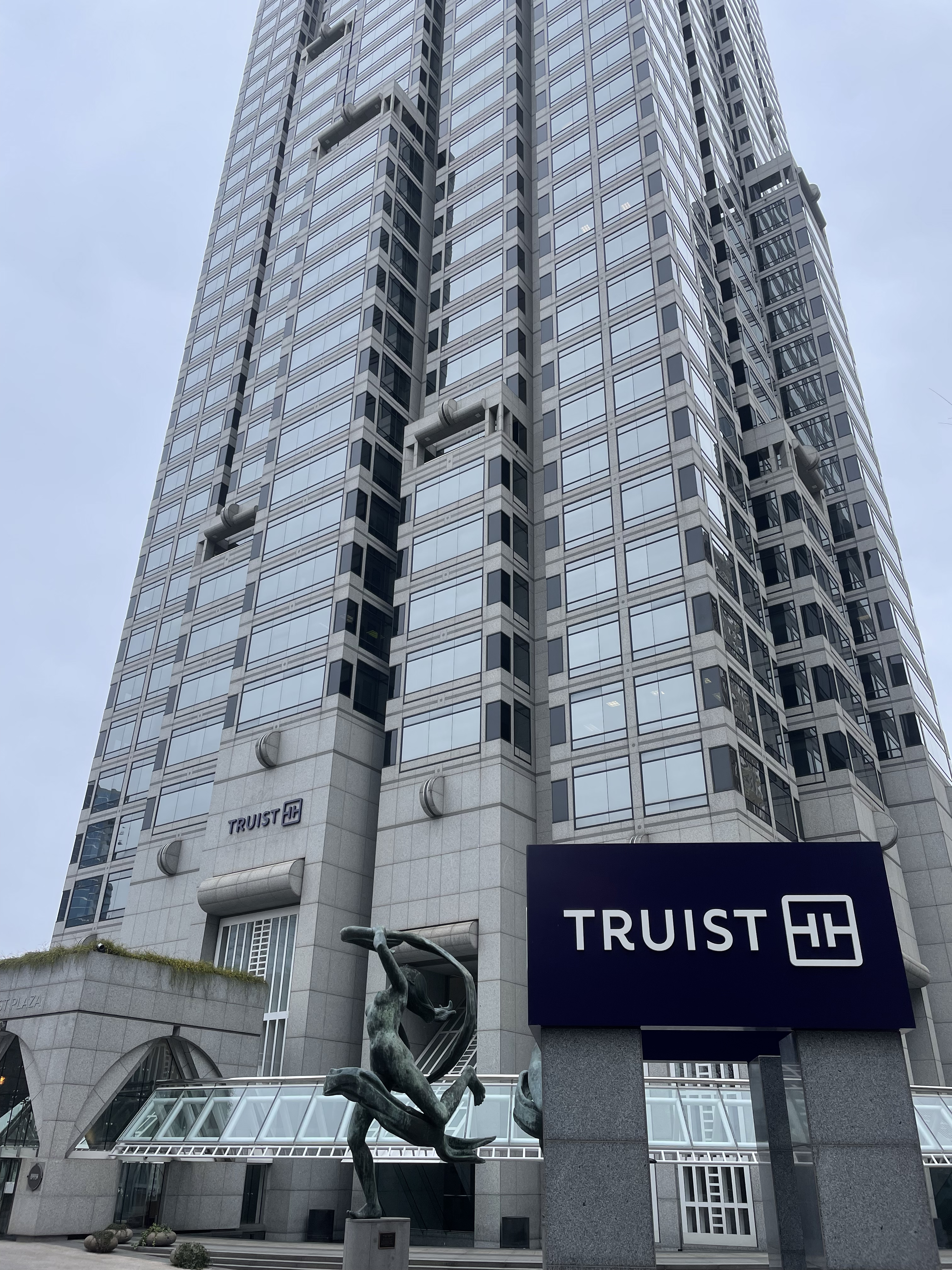
Peachtree Street entrance

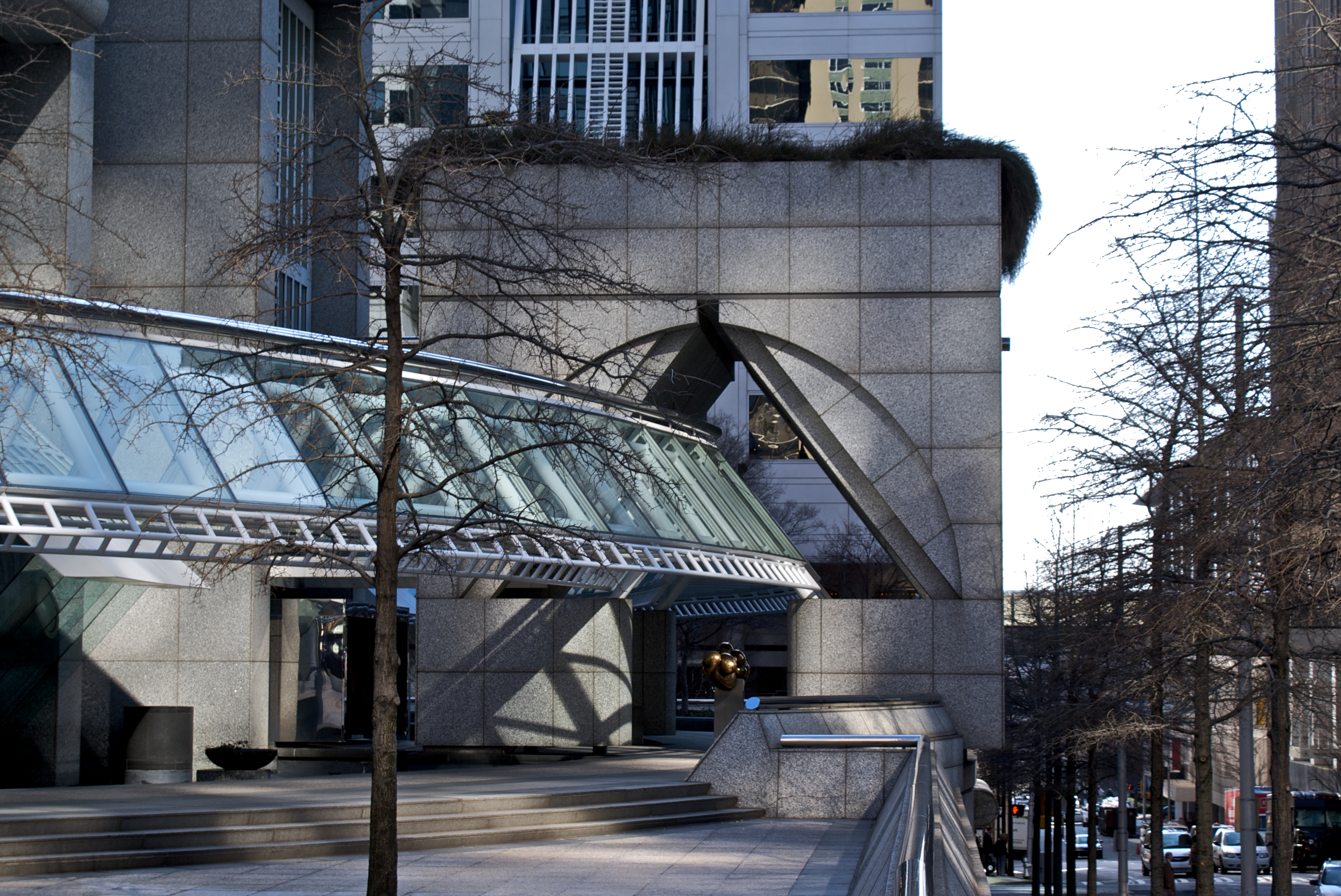
Perimeter around building at street level

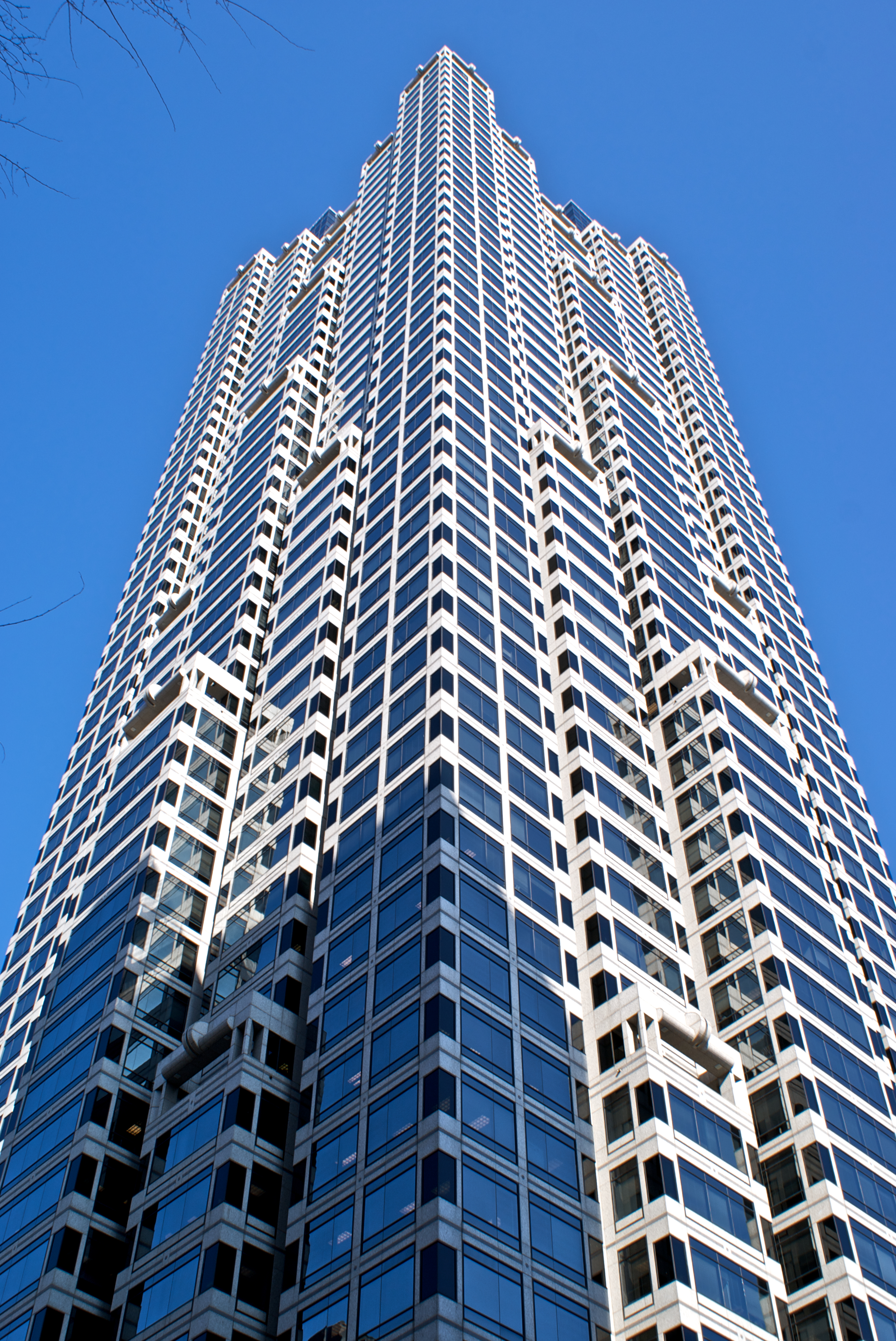
View from the corner of Baker Street and Peachtree Center Avenue

== See also ==
- List of tallest buildings in Atlanta
- List of tallest buildings in the United States
