= AmericasMart =

Wholesale market in Atlanta, Georgia, US

Coordinates: 33.760473°N 84.387751°W

AmericasMart Atlanta is a wholesale trade center located in downtown Atlanta, Georgia. The exhibition center is one of the largest permanent wholesale trade centers in the world. AmericasMart Atlanta consists of three buildings totaling seven million square feet. The Mart opened in 1957, as Atlanta Market Center (AMC), and hosts more than a dozen trade shows every year including The Atlanta International Gift and Home Furnishings Market, Atlanta Apparel and Fall Design Week. Trade show exhibitors rent permanent showrooms as well as temporary booths during trade shows. Some permanent showrooms are open daily, though many are open only part of the time or during trade shows. AmericasMart Atlanta is not open to the public and only employees and guests of registered businesses are admitted.

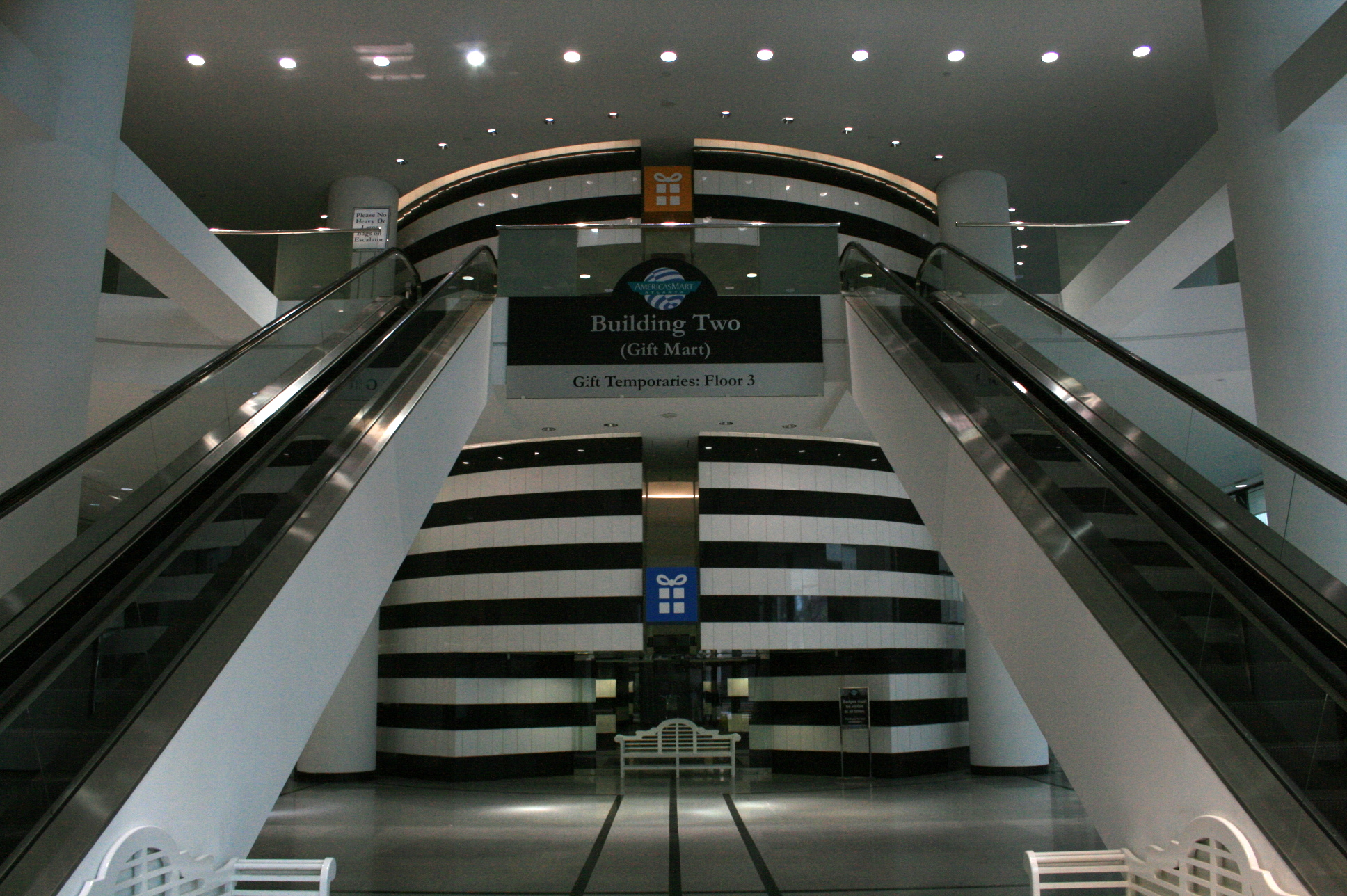
The lobby of building 2 pictured in 2008

== Structure ==
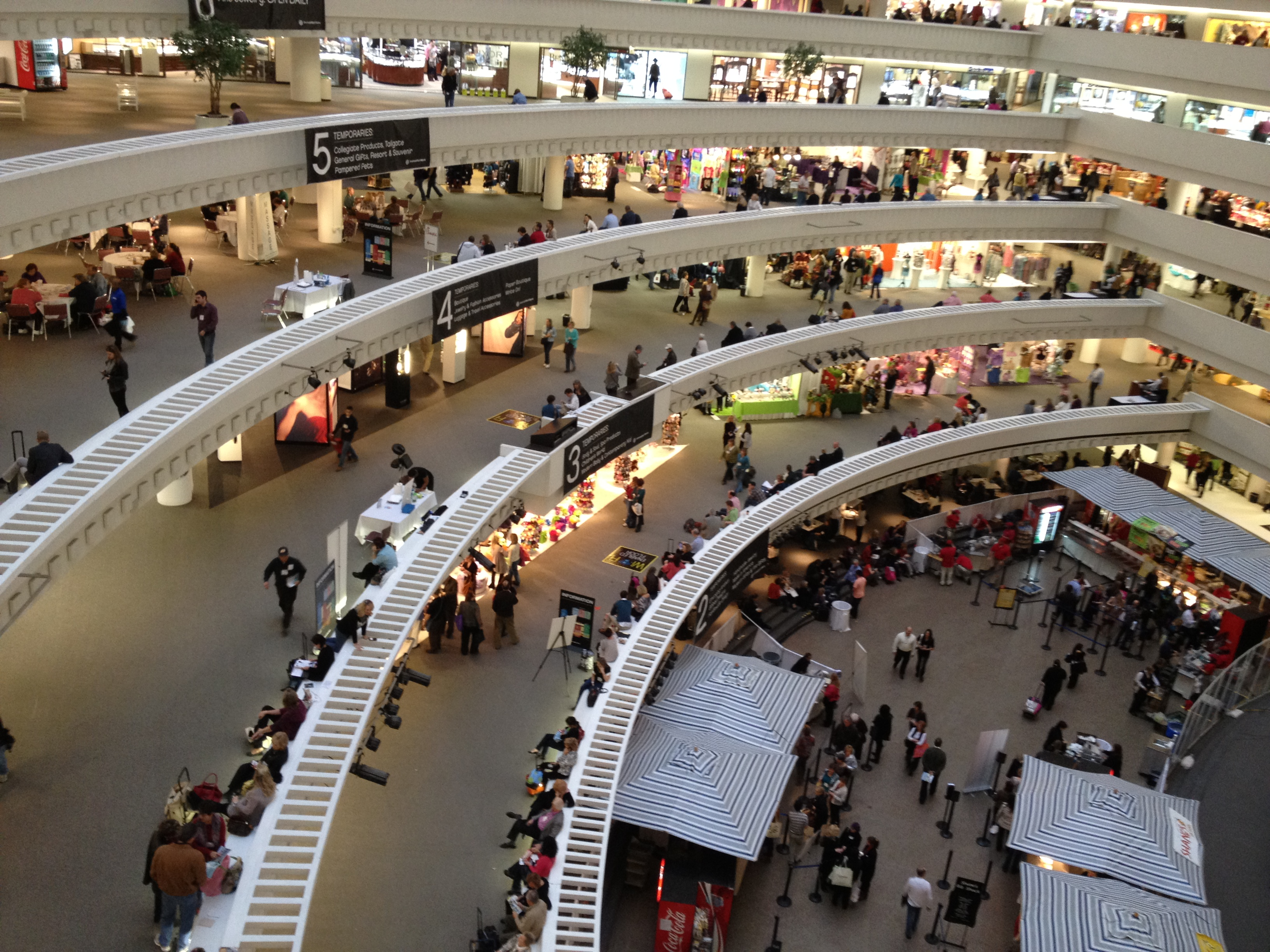
The Atlanta International Gift and Home Furnishings Market, January 2012

AmericasMart Atlanta consists of three buildings, Building One, Building Two and Building Three. The Mart’s main address is 240 Peachtree Street NW, Suite 2200, which is where the first building is located. Buildings Two and Three are located on Ted Turner Drive. Pedestrian bridges connect the different buildings of the Mart for indoor access between buildings.

== History ==
A local architect of Atlanta, John C. Portman, designed the Atlanta Mart. The Mart opened in 1957, and Portman held many positions of leadership since the founding. These include chairman of the board, chief executive officer, and a director. John Portman’s son, Jeffrey Portman served as the President of AMC, Inc. from 1994 to 2018. In 1996 Jeffrey Portman renamed the trading center AmericasMart, as before it was known as the Atlanta Market Center. AmericasMart merged with ANDMORE (formerly International Market Centers) in 2018.

== Entrance ==
The mart is a place to buy wholesale products and it is expected that the products the buyers purchase at the mart are then resold in their businesses. Therefore the mart is closed to the public. Buyers must register their businesses with the Mart and are required to check in upon arrival. A business must visit the Mart with a specified regularity or forfeit its membership. A company may bring employees and guests to assist with purchasing decisions.

== Trade shows ==
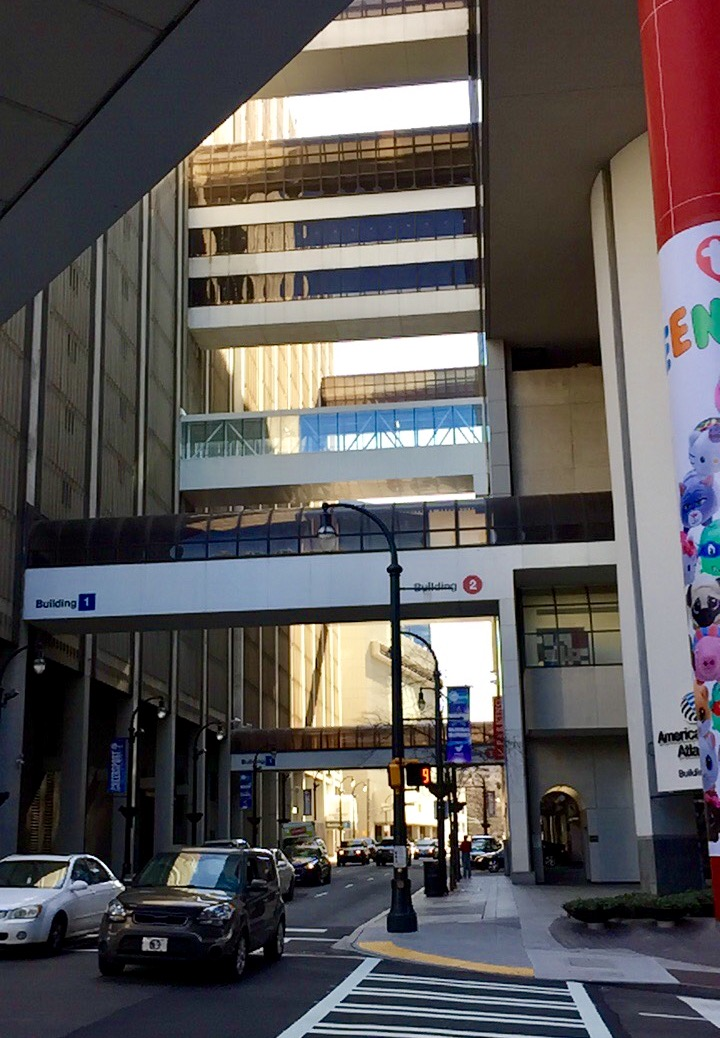
Sky bridges cross Ted Turner Drive connecting AmericasMart buildings

AmericasMart sponsors several trade shows each year.

Atlanta Apparel
The Atlanta Apparel show is focused on selling clothing, shoes, and accessories.

Atlanta International Gift and Home Furnishings Market
The Atlanta International Gift and Home Furnishings Market is one of the largest wholesale home and gift shows in the world with hundreds of thousands buyers and sellers in attendance. Major Shows occur in January and July, Smaller Shows occur in March and September.

Atlanta International Area Rug Market
The Atlanta International Area Rug Market offers area rugs at wholesale cost.

Atlanta Immediate Delivery Show
The Atlanta Immediate Delivery Show of is a cash and carry event at which exhibitors offer merchandise for sale and immediate delivery at the event.

Market Wednesday
Market Wednesday takes place the first Wednesday of the month when there is no large trade show that month (February, April, June, August, October and December)
