= Bodil Award for Best Documentary =

Annual Danish film award

The Bodil Award for Best Documentary is one of the categories for the Bodil Awards presented annually by the Danish Film Critics Association. It was created in 1948 but has only been presented annually since 2007.

== Honorees ==
=== 1940s and 1950s ===
- 1948: Papir og pap er penge værd directed by Ole Palsbo
- 1956: Hvor bjergene sejler directed by Bjarne Henning-Jensen
- 1957: Ellehammer directed by Jørgen Roos

=== 1960s ===
- 1961: Enden på legen directed by Theodor Christensen
- 1964: En ny virkelighed directed by Børge Høst
- 1965: Michel Simon and PH lys directed by Ole Roos
- 1966: Knud directed by Jørgen Roos
- 1968: Kongens Enghave directed by Claus Ørsted
- 1969: Eftermiddagsgæsten directed by Peter Refn

=== 1970s ===
- 1970: Livet er en cirkus directed by Per Holst
- 1972: Livet i Danmark directed by Jørgen Leth
- 1976: Dejlig er den himmel blå directed by Solvognen
- 1978: Jenny directed by Jon Bang Carlsen

=== 1980s ===
- 1981: Tomas et barn du ikke kan nå directed by Lone Hertz
- 1982: Historien om Kim Skov directed by Hans-Henrik Jørgensen
- 1984: Fugl Fønix directed by Jon Bang Carlsen
- 1986: Den erindrende directed by Jytte Rex

=== 1990s ===
- 1996: Carl Th. Dreyer: My Metier directed by Torben Skjødt Jensen

=== 2000s ===
- 2005: Tintin and I directed by Anders Østergaard
- 2007: Gasolin' directed by Anders Østergaard
- 2008: The Monastery: Mr. Vig and the Nun directed by Pernille Rose Grønkjær
- 2009: Burma VJ directed by Anders Østergaard

=== 2010s ===
- 2010: Blekingegade Gang directed by Anders Riis-Hansen
- 2011: Armadillo directed by Janus Metz
- 2012: Testamentet directed by Christian Sønderby Jepsen
- 2013: Putin's Kiss directed by Lise Birk Pedersen
- 2014: Ai Weiwei: The Fake Case directed by Andreas Johnsen
- 2015: The Look of Silence directed by Joshua Oppenheimer
- 2016: The Man Who Saved the World directed by Peter Anthony
- 2017: The War Show directed by Obaidah Zytoon and Andreas Dalsgaard
- 2018: Last Men in Aleppo directed by Feras Fayyad
- 2019: Olegs Krig – en barndom i krigens skygge directed by Simon Lereng Wilmont
  - Bobbi Jene directed by Elvira Lind
  - Fanget i de fries land directed by Camilla Magid
  - Hjertelandet directed by Janus Metz & Sine Plambech
  - Skjold & Isabel directed by Emil Næsby Hansen

=== 2020s ===
- 2020: Q's Barbershop directed by Emil Langballe
  - Et ægte par directed by Emil Langballe
  - Forglem mig ej directed by Sun Hee Engelstoft
  - Håbets ø directed by Sidse Torstholm Larsen and Sturla Pilskog
  - Western Arabs directed by Omar Shargawi
- 2021: En splittet familie directed by Mira Jargil
  - The Cave directed by Feras Fayyad
  - I Love You I Miss You I Hope I See You Before I Die directed by Eva Marie Rødbro
  - Rejsen til Utopia directed by Erlend E. Mo
  - Undertrykkelsens sang directed by Estephan Wagner and Marianne Hougen-Moraga
- 2022: Flee directed by Jonas Poher Rasmussen
  - Fra det vilde hav directed by Robin Petré
  - Kandis for livet directed by Jesper Dalgaard
  - President directed by Camilla Nielsson
  - Skál/Skål directed by Cecilie Debell and Maria Guldbrandsø Tórgarð
- 2023: A House Made of Splinters directed by Simon Lereng Wilmont
  - Mr. Graversen directed by Michael Graversen
  - Se mig som jeg er directed by Louise Leth
  - The Lost Leonardo directed by Andreas Koefoed
  - Tsumu directed by Kasper Kiertzner
- 2024: Apolonia, Apolonia directed by Lea Glob
  - Music for Black Pigeons directed by Andreas Koefoed and Jørgen Leth
  - A Storm Foretold directed by Christoffer Guldbrandsen
  - Munken directed by Mira Jargil and Christian Sønderby Jepsen
  - Twice Colonized by Lin Alluna
- 2025: Min arv bor i dig directed by Roja Pakari

== See also ==
- Robert Award for Best Documentary Feature
- Robert Award for Best Documentary Short
