= Martin Kemp (art historian) =

British art historian (born 1942)

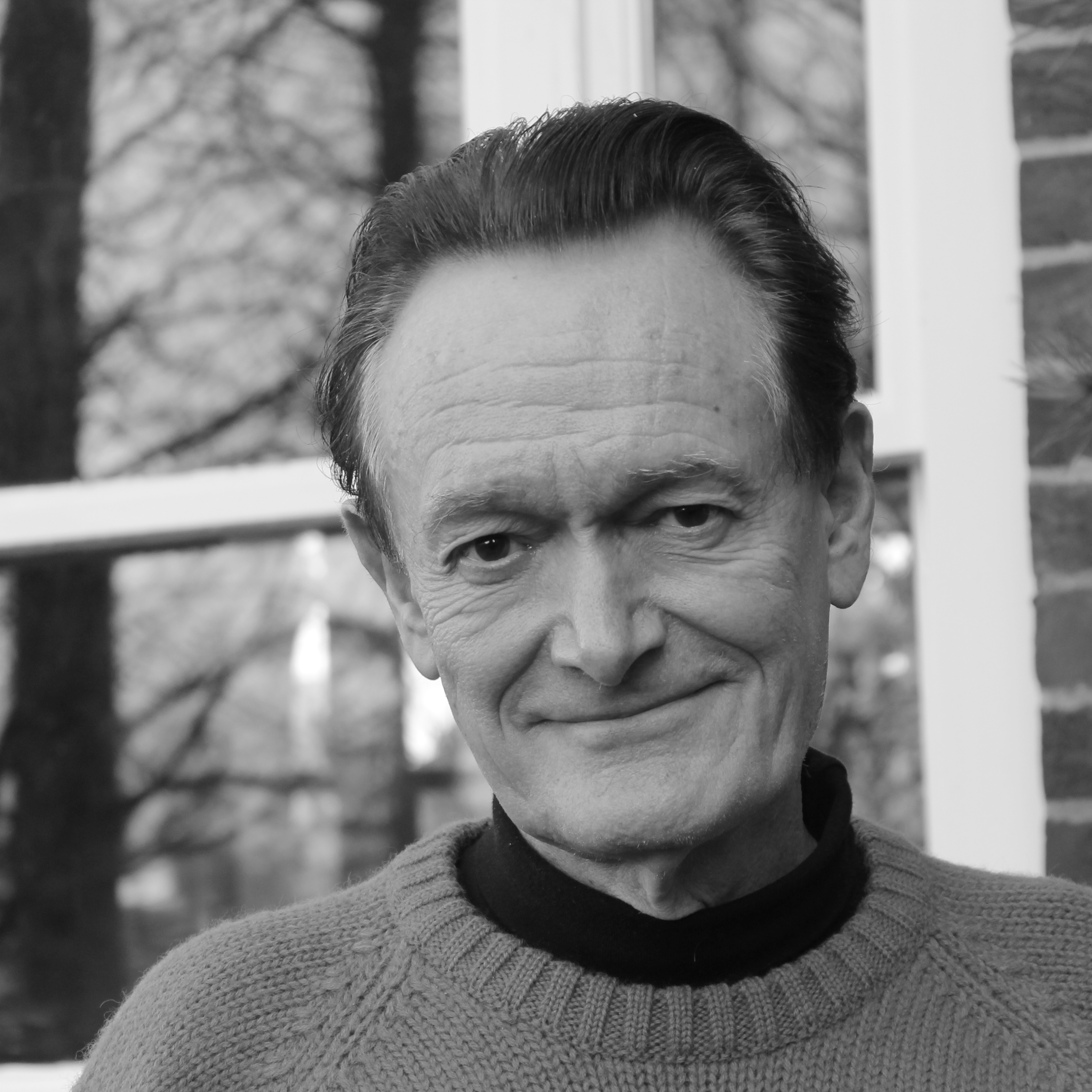
- Kemp in 2014
- Born: Martin John Kemp; 5 March 1942 (age 84)
- Known for: Leonardo da Vinci scholarship; Images in art and science

Academic background
- Education: Downing College; Courtauld Institute of Art

Academic work
- Discipline: Art history
- Institutions: Department of History of Art, University of Oxford
- Website: www.martinjkemp.com

Martin John Kemp FBA (born 5 March 1942) is a British art historian and exhibition curator who is one of the world's leading authorities on the life and works of Leonardo da Vinci. The author of many books on Leonardo, Kemp has also written about visualisation in art and science, particularly anatomy, natural sciences and optics. Instrumental in the controversial authentication of Salvator Mundi to Leonardo, Kemp has been vocal on attributions to Leonardo, including support of La Bella Principessa and opposition to the Isleworth Mona Lisa.

From 1995 to 2008 he was professor of art history at the University of Oxford and has continued since then as an emeritus professor. He previously held posts at University of St Andrews (1981–1995) and University of Glasgow (1966–1981). He holds honorary fellowships of both Trinity College, Oxford, and Downing College, Cambridge, and is a fellow of the British Academy.

== Early life ==
In his youth, Kemp attended Windsor Grammar School. (Note: Now known as The Windsor Boys' School) From 1960 to 1963, he studied natural sciences and art history at Downing College, Cambridge, (Note: A constituent college of the University of Cambridge) and the history of Western Art at the Courtauld Institute of Art, University of London, from 1963 to 1965.

== Career ==
For more than 25 years Kemp was based in Scotland where from 1966 to 1981 he was a lecturer at University of Glasgow and professor of Fine Arts from 1981 to 1990 and professor of the History and Theory of Art from 1990 to 1995 at University of St Andrews. He was professor of Art History at the University of Oxford from 1995 to 2008, during which he helped create the Centre for Visual Studies, which opened in 1999. Notably, Edgar Wind had held this post from 1955 to 1967 and subsequently Francis Haskell from 1967 to 1995. Since 2008 he has been emeritus professor of the art history there. He has held visiting professorship posts at Princeton University, the University of Cambridge, the University of Chicago and Harvard University. He received the prestigious British Academy Wolfson Research Professorship—an award offered by the Wolfson Foundation—and from 1993 to 1998 he was elected a fellow of the British Academy in 1991. With art historian Marina Wallace, Kemp launched the "Universal Leonardo" website. In 2022, Kemp and author Waqas Ahmed created an online course entitled "The Da Vinci Masterclass" highlighting Leonardo's career. Menachem Wecker for ArtNet commented that the course "illuminated both Leonardo's and Kemp's ways of thinking". The course was also presented in-person at the Royal Institution in 2023.

=== Books ===
Kemp has written many books about Leonardo da Vinci, his first of which, Leonardo da Vinci. The Marvellous Works of Nature and Man in 1981, won the Mitchell Prize in art history for best first book. He has published on imagery in the sciences of anatomy, natural history and optics, including The Science of Art: Optical Themes in Western Art from Brunelleschi to Seurat (Yale University Press). The art theorist and psychologist Rudolf Arnheim said that The Science of Art "may deserve to be called the definitive treatise on its topic" though its detail may make it difficult reading for non-specialists.

Kemp has written a regular column called "Science in Culture" in the scientific journal Nature. Selections of these columns have been published as Visualisations (OUP, 2000) and Seen and Unseen (OUP, 2006): the latter exploring his concept of "structural intuitions". Reviewing Visualisations, the historian of ideas Scott L. Montgomery described Kemp as like a "master gardener" who "for nearly two decades, [...] has helped shape this new field in major ways, planting a wide array of topics, arranging the colors of their importance, surveying and reconstituting the efforts of others, all the while adding original species of insight and subject matter." In 2011 he published Christ to Coke: How Image becomes Icon (OUP, 2011).

=== Salvator Mundi ===
The Salvator Mundi is a painted wooden panel depicting Christ. It was exhibited in 2011 as an original work by Leonardo da Vinci, but the attribution has been controversial, with some scholars describing da Vinci as a contributor but not the main artist. Kemp's research supported its attribution to Leonardo. He said that as soon as he viewed the painting, he recognised the presence and "uncanny strangeness" of Leonardo's works. The painting was sold in 2017, setting a new record for the most expensive painting ever sold at public auction. In a 2019 book, Kemp identifies symbolism in the painting that is familiar from Leonardo's other religious paintings. He is interviewed in the 2021 documentary about the work, The Lost Leonardo.

=== La Bella Principessa ===
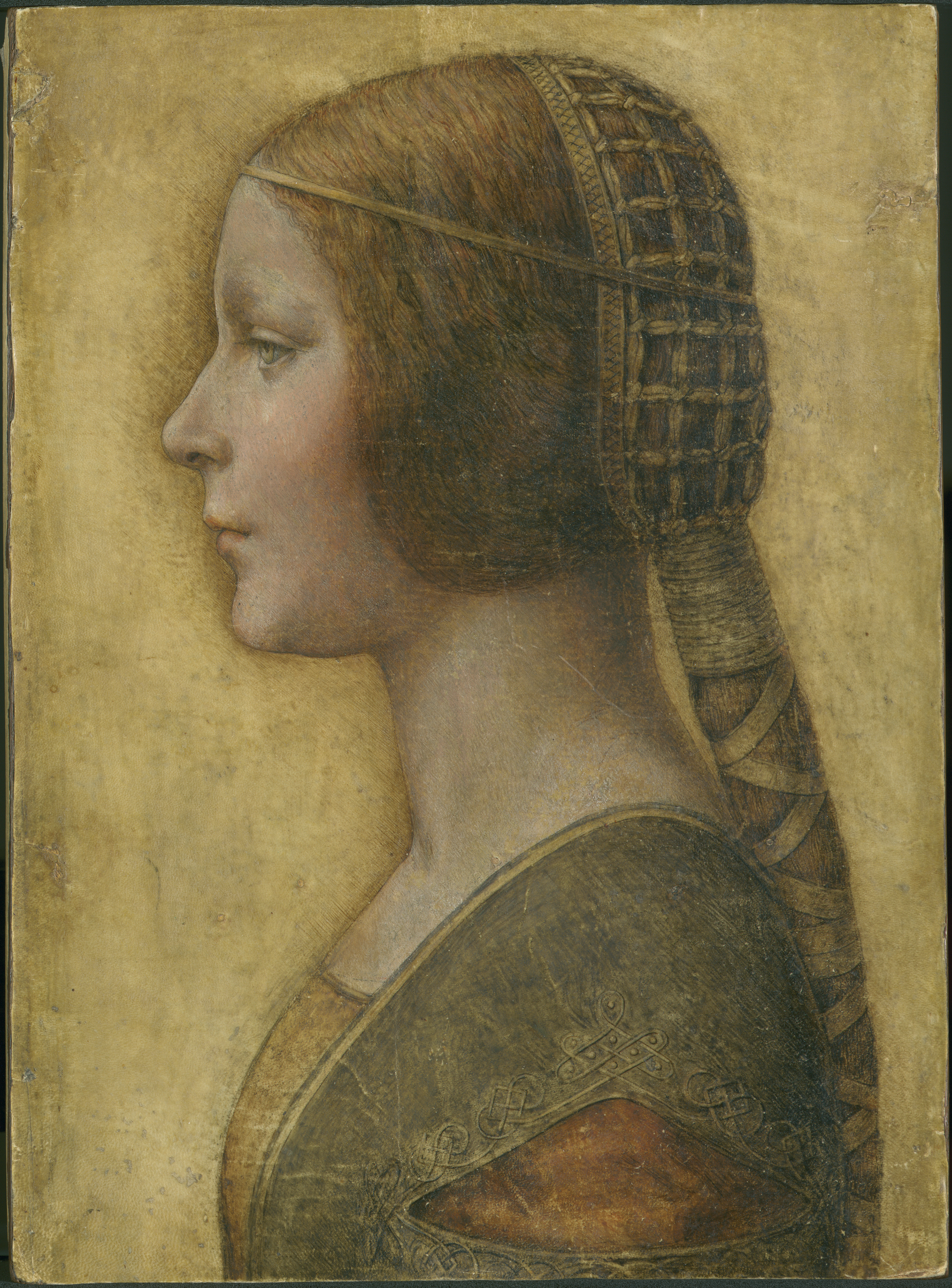
La Bella Principessa

In 2010 Kemp published a monograph with French engineer Pascal Cotte, recounting the story of how a team of experts—under his guidance—pieced together the evidence for the theory that the painting now named La Bella Principessa was by Leonardo. The book, entitled La Bella Principessa (2010), narrates the steps Kemp and Cotte took in researching the painting. The 2012 Italian edition, La bella principessa di Leonardo da Vinci produces evidence about its origins.

== Exhibitions ==
- Guest curator for Circa 1492 at the National Gallery of Art in Washington in 1992.
- Spectacular Bodies: the Art and Science of the Human Body from Leonardo to Now at the Hayward Gallery, London (2001) (curated with Marina Wallace) A review of the exhibition catalogue described it as "a fascinating overview of the efforts over the past five centuries to understand the body through the intersecting lenses of art and science".
- Leonardo da Vinci: Experience, Experiment, Design at the Victoria and Albert Museum, London (2006)
- Seduced: Art and Sex from Antiquity to Now at the Barbican Art Gallery, London (2007)
- Hockney's Eye (co-curator) at the Fitzwilliam Museum and Downing College Heong Gallery, Cambridge (2022)

== Selected bibliography ==
- Kemp, Martin (1990). The Science of Art: Optical Themes in Western Art from Brunelleschi to Seurat. New Haven: Yale University Press. ISBN 978-0-300-04337-2. OCLC 18832748. reprinted with revisions in 1992.
- —— (1997). Behind The Picture: Art and Evidence in the Italian Renaissance. New Haven: Yale University Press. ISBN 978-0-300-07195-5. OCLC 37195363.
- —— (2006). Leonardo Da Vinci: The Marvellous Works of Nature and Man. Oxford: Oxford University Press. ISBN 978-0-19-920778-7.
- —— (2006). Seen/Unseen: Art, Science, and intuition from Leonardo to the Hubble Telescope. Oxford: Oxford University Press. ISBN 978-0-19-929572-2. OCLC 69331733.
- ——; Wells, Thereza (2011). Leonardo da Vinci's Madonna of the Yarnwinder: A Historical and Scientific Detective Story. London: Artakt & Zidane Press. ISBN 978-0-9554-8506-0. OCLC 267206478.
- —— (2012). Christ to COKE: How Image Becomes Icon. Oxford: Oxford University Press. ISBN 978-0-19-161704-1. OCLC 763156933.
- —— (2013). The Chapel of Trinity College, Oxford, 1691–94: 'A Beautiful Magnificent Structure'. London: Scala Arts & Heritage Publishers. ISBN 978-1-85759-824-7. OCLC 834412864.
- —— (2015). Art in History, 600 BC – 2000 AD. London: Profile Books. ISBN 978-1-78283-102-0. OCLC 905983684.
- —— (2004). Leonardo. Oxford: Oxford University Press. ISBN 978-0-19-280546-1. OCLC 55682608.

- —— (2011) [2004]. Leonardo (Revised ed.). Oxford: Oxford University Press. ISBN 978-0-19-958335-5. OCLC 0199583358.

- —— (2016). Structural Intuitions: Seeing Shapes in Art and Science. Charlottesville: University of Virginia Press. ISBN 978-0-8139-3699-4. OCLC 936204711.
- ——; Pallanti, Giuseppe (2017). Mona Lisa: The People and the Painting. Oxford: Oxford University Press. ISBN 978-0-19-874990-5. OCLC 966534826.
- —— (2018). Living with Leonardo: Fifty Years of Sanity and Insanity in the Art World and Beyond. London: Thames & Hudson. ISBN 978-0-500-23956-8. OCLC 1029249747.
- ——; Dalivalle, Margaret; Simon, Robert Barry (2019). Leonardo's Salvator Mundi & The Collecting of Leonardo in the Stuart Courts (First ed.). Oxford. ISBN 978-0-19-254328-8. OCLC 1127668595.
- —— (2019). Leonardo da Vinci: The 100 Milestones. New York: Sterling. ISBN 978-1-4549-304-26. OCLC 1099590992.
- —— (2019). Leonardo by Leonardo. New York: Callaway Arts & Entertainment. ISBN 978-0-935112-82-5. OCLC 1083154267.
- —— (2021). Visions of Heaven: Dante and the Art of Divine Light. London: Lund Humphries. ISBN 978-1-84822-467-4. OCLC 1183423539.

As editor

- Vasari, Giorgio (2019). The Life of Leonardo da Vinci. Translated by Kemp, Martin; Russell, Lucy Emma Victoria. New York: Thames & Hudson. ISBN 978-0-500-23985-8. OCLC 1079261129.
- Leonardo da Vinci (2019). Laurenza, Domenico; Kemp, Martin (eds.). Leonardo da Vinci's Codex Leicester: A New Edition (1st ed.). Oxford: Oxford University Press. ISBN 978-0-19-883287-4. OCLC 1108727522.
