= Robert B. Simon =

American art historian and art dealer

- Education: Columbia University (BA, MA, PhD)
- Occupations: art dealer, art historian
- Known for: rediscovering Da Vinci's Salvator Mundi

Robert B. Simon (born 27 November 1952, New York) is an American art historian and art dealer most known for rediscovering Leonardo da Vinci's painting Salvator Mundi.

== Education ==
Simon received his B.A., M.A., M.Phil., and Ph.D. degrees, all from Columbia University, where his doctoral thesis focused on Bronzino’s portraits of Cosimo I de’ Medici.

== Career in art ==
After graduating from Columbia, he worked as an art appraiser, researcher, and consultant of Old Master paintings. In 1997, he sold a watercolor by Richard Dadd and opened an art gallery on Upper East Side. Simon has been described as part of an elite group of curators and dealers, known as the "eyes," who carry a unique instinct that can distinguish authentic paintings from copies and spot lost treasures.

=== Salvator Mundi ===
In 2005, Simon, with his friend and colleague, art speculator Alexander Parish, acquired Da Vinci's original Salvator Mundi, then thought to be lost, from a New Orleans auction gallery for $1,175. He brought the painting to New York University professor Dianne Dwyer Modestini for a detailed restoration, and sent it to numerous scholars for verification that the painting had belonged to Da Vinci, including Metropolitan Museum of Art curator Keith Christiansen and National Gallery director Nicholas Penny. After it was authenticated, Simon loaned the painting to a few museums before putting it on sale, only to be frustrated by museums that balked at the $100 million price tag. Eventually, Simon sold the painting to Swiss art dealer Yves Bouvier for a sum of $80 million, who then sold the painting to Russian businessman Dmitry Rybolovlev for $127.5 million.

Simon co-authored Leonardo’s Salvator Mundi and the Collecting of Leonardo in the Stuart Courts with art historians Martin Kemp and Margaret Dalivalle. The book was by Oxford University Press in 2019. He was also featured in the 2021 documentary, The Lost Leonardo.

== See also ==
- The Lost Leonardo, 2021 film in which Simon is interviewed
