= The Bodybuilder and I =

- Directed by: Bryan Friedman
- Written by: Bryan Friedman
- Produced by: Julia Rosenberg; Anita Lee
- Starring: Bill Friedman
- Cinematography: Alan Poon
- Edited by: Seth Poulin
- Music by: Jim Guthrie
- Distributed by: January Films
- Release date: 2007
- Running time: 92 minutes
- Country: Canada
- Language: English

The Bodybuilder and I is a 2007 feature-length documentary film written and directed by Bryan Friedman, taking viewers on a journey into the subculture of geriatric bodybuilding as the filmmaker tries to reconnect with his father. The film is co-produced by January Films and the National Film Board of Canada.

== Synopsis ==
59-year-old Bill Friedman is a competitive bodybuilder - a former world champ in the age 50-60 category, determined to win his title back. Documentary director Bryan Friedman is 26. Bill - Bryan's dad - hasn't been around since Bryan was a baby. In The Bodybuilder and I, Bryan chronicles his father's attempt to make it back to the top. In the process of making the film, the two men get to know one another and maybe begin to understand each other.

== Awards ==
The film was the winner of the Best Canadian Feature Documentary award at Hot Docs, and co-winner of the Best Canadian Documentary Award at the Atlantic Film Festival.

== Theatrical release ==
The Bodybuilder and I began a limited theatrical release in Toronto, Vancouver and Ottawa on November 2, 2007.

== See also ==
- Afghan Muscles
