= Hyatt Regency Atlanta =

Business hotel in Atlanta, Georgia

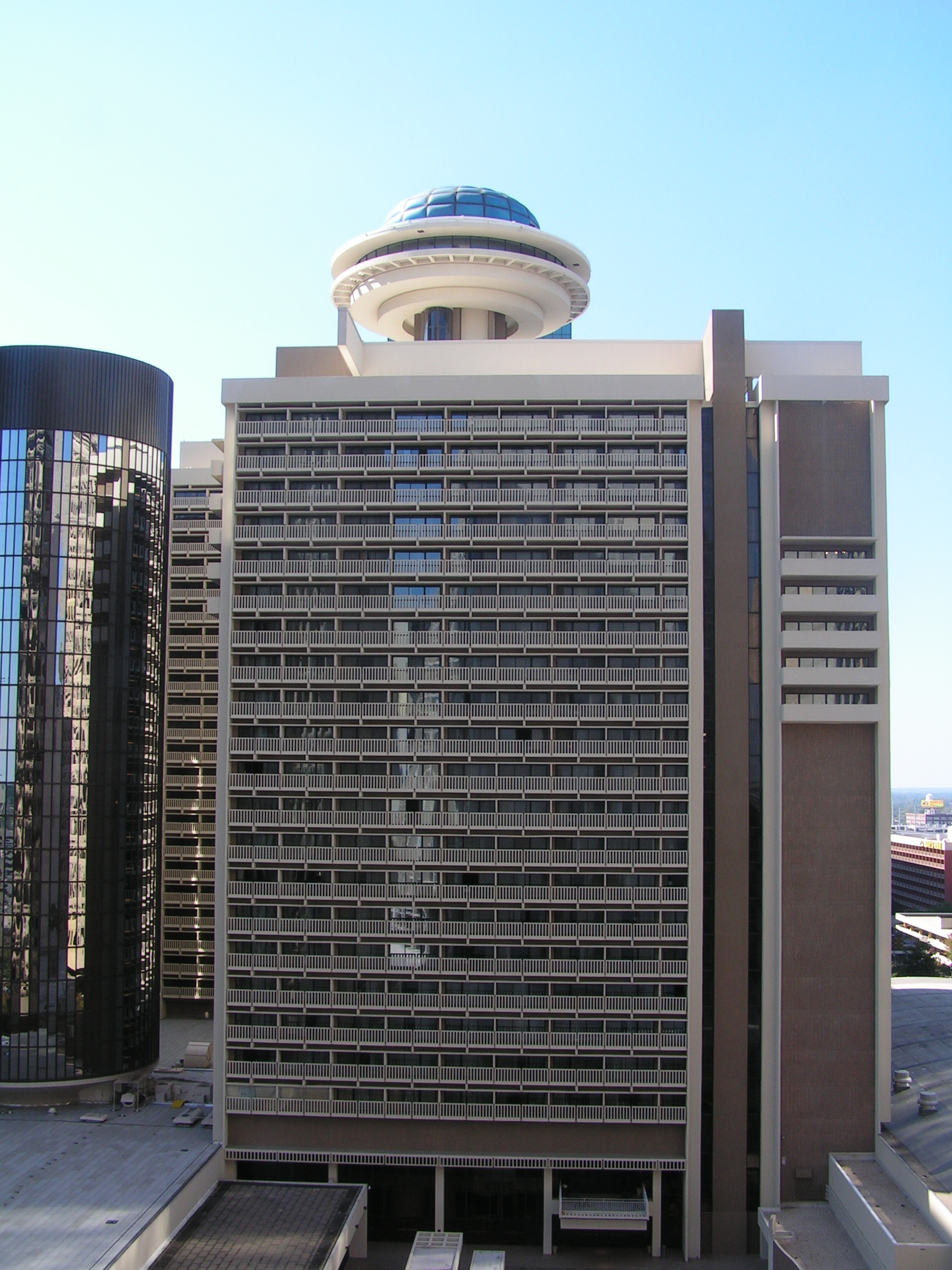
- Viewed from the Atlanta Marriott Marquis
- Interactive map of the Hyatt Regency Atlanta area
- Hotel chain: Hyatt Hotels Corporation

General information
- Architectural style: Neo-futurist
- Location: 265 Peachtree Road NE; Atlanta, Georgia, United States
- Coordinates: 33.76138°N 84.38666°W
- Opening: 1967

Height
- Height: 103.63 m (340.0 ft)

Technical details
- Floor count: 25 in Atrium Tower, 24 in International Tower, 21 in Radius Tower
- Lifts/elevators: 7 in the Atrium Tower, 3 in the radius tower, 5 in the international tower

Design and construction
- Architect: John Portman & Associates

Other information
- Number of rooms: 1,260
- Number of restaurants: Sway; Twenty-Two Storeys; Market; Polaris

Website
- https://www.hyatt.com/en-US/hotel/georgia/hyatt-regency-atlanta/atlra

The Hyatt Regency Atlanta is a business hotel located on Peachtree Street in downtown Atlanta, Georgia. Opened in 1967 as the Regency Hyatt House, John C. Portman Jr.'s revolutionary 22-story atrium design for the hotel has influenced hotel design enormously in the years since. The hotel instantly became one of the most recognized buildings in Atlanta.

The building consists of the main "Atrium Tower" and two extensions, completed in 1971 and 1982, respectively, containing a total of 1,260 rooms. On top of the Hyatt Regency is a revolving restaurant called Polaris, located just beneath the blue dome-shaped structure which gives the hotel its distinctive profile. This was Portman's first designed revolving restaurant of many. When the hotel first opened, the restaurant gave diners an ever-changing panoramic view of the entire city; however, as taller buildings were erected on all sides of the hotel, the restaurant's view became increasingly constricted. The Polaris closed in August 2004 and remained empty until renovation plans were approved in 2013. Polaris reopened in June 2014.

In 1971, the Ivy Tower (now called Radius Tower) was constructed, which was also designed by John Portman. It closely resembles his Westin Peachtree Plaza, which opened five years later. So similar are the two buildings that in 1981, the Tower doubled for the Peachtree Plaza in the film Sharky's Machine starring Burt Reynolds. Stuntman Dar Robinson dropped (67 m (220 ft)) from the Tower, setting a record for the highest freefall (unrestrained) jump from a building in a film. In 1969, Jim Morrison, lead singer of The Doors, stayed at the Hyatt Regency Atlanta while attending the Atlanta Film Festival. At the awards ceremony, he gave his room key to the woman presenting him the plaque.

In 1982, the International Tower was added, which is the same as the original design but has expanded rooms and suites.

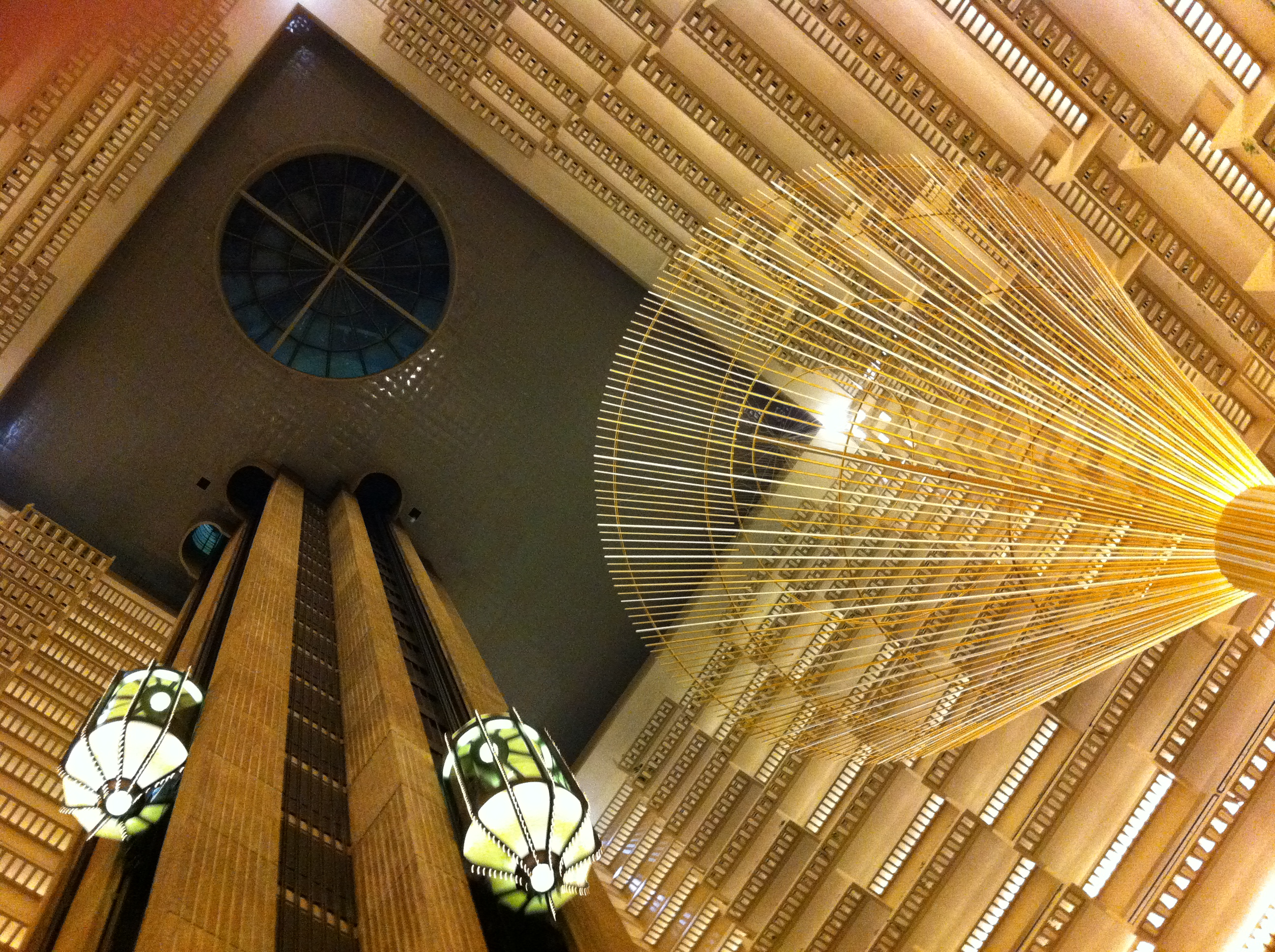
View of the Atrium and glass elevators looking up from the lobby floor

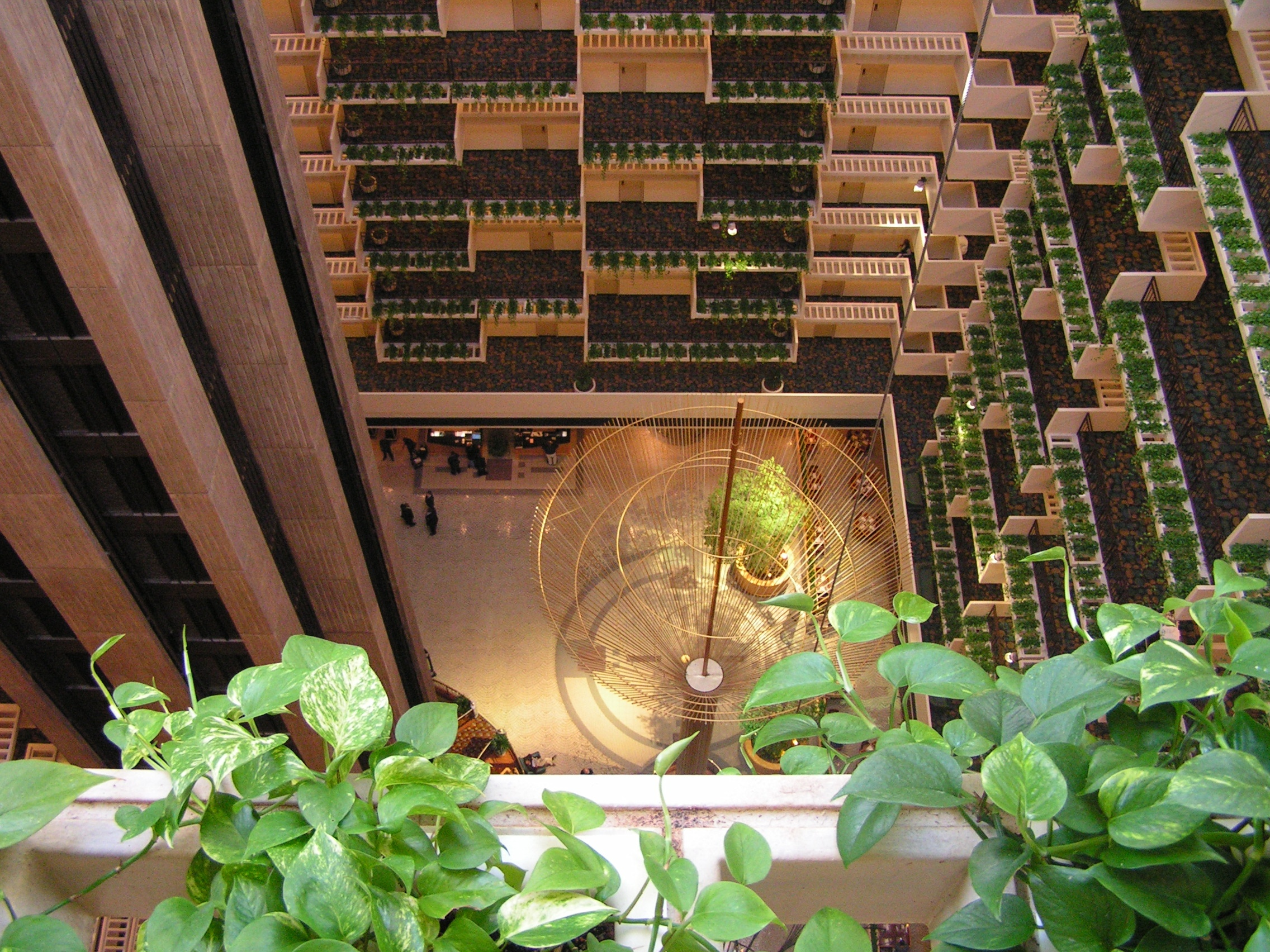
View of the Atrium from the 8th floor

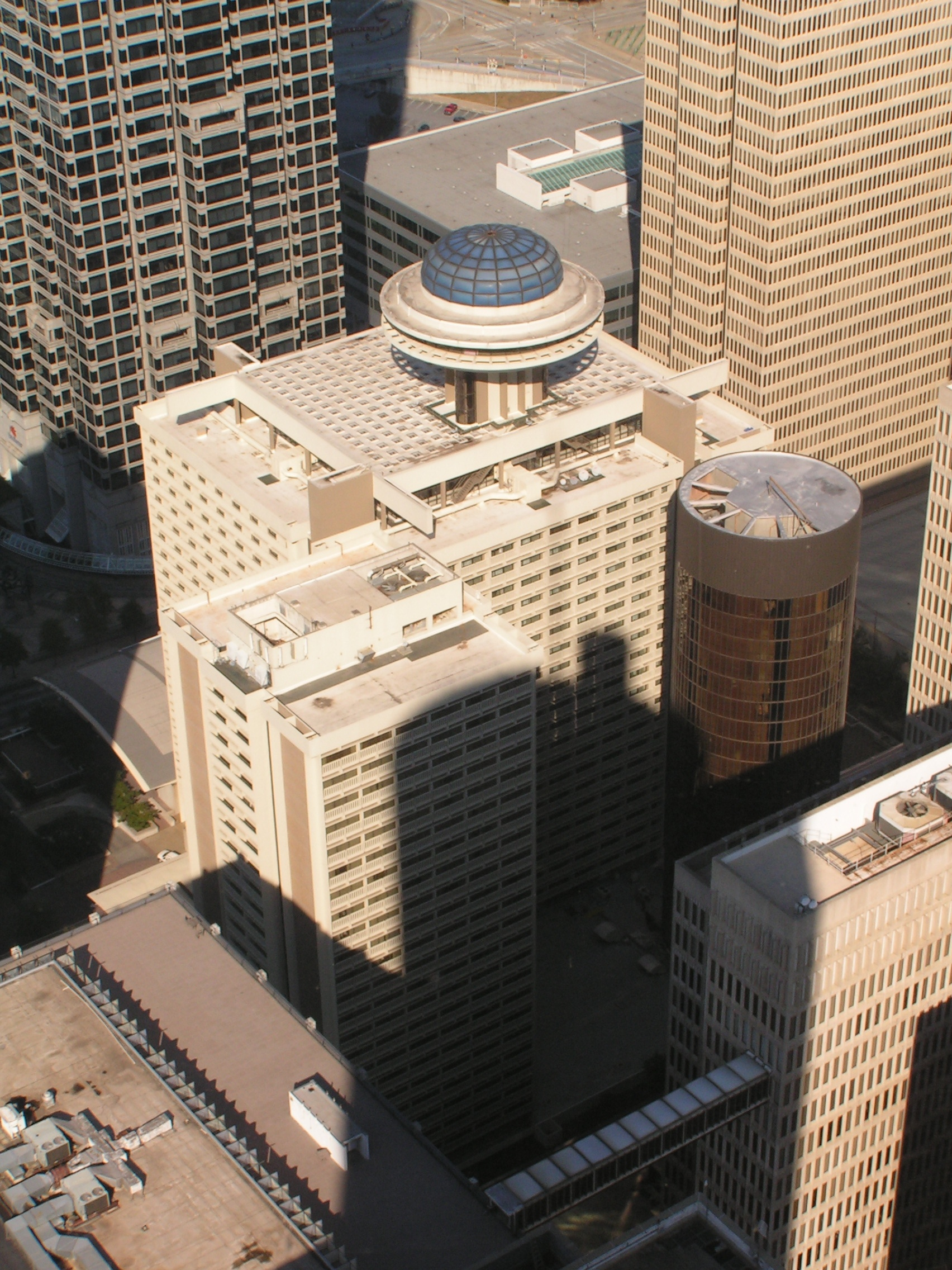
View of the Hyatt from the Westin Peachtree Plaza

== See also ==
- Hotels in Atlanta
