= Afghan Muscles =

- Publicity photo of Hamidullah Shirzai
- Directed by: Andreas Møl Dalsgaard
- Written by: Andreas Møl Dalsgaard; Oliver Winding
- Produced by: Jesper Morthorst; Michael Haslund-Christensen
- Starring: Hamidullah Shirzai; Noorulhoda Shirzad
- Cinematography: Frederik Jacobi; Andreas Møl Dalsgaard
- Edited by: My Thordahl
- Music by: Fridolin Tai Nordsø Schjoldan
- Distributed by: Cinema Guild (U.S.)
- Release date: 15 November 2006 (Denmark)
- Running time: 59 minutes
- Country: Denmark
- Languages: Persian and Arabic

Afghan Muscles is a 2006 Danish documentary film directed by Andreas Møl Dalsgaard about bodybuilding in Afghanistan.

== Synopsis ==
Following the 2001 United States-led invasion and the overthrow of the Taliban government, bodybuilding has enjoyed a renaissance in Afghanistan. The film follows the lives of two Afghan bodybuilding champions, Hamidullah Shirzai and Noorulhoda Shirzad, who are part of the national team training for the 2004 Mr. Asia competition in Bahrain. Although the men enjoy celebrity status in their country, their training is hampered by a lack of financial support, problems in gaining access to the bodybuilding supplements and professional guidance that would improve their competitive performances, and the ongoing military conflict across Afghanistan. Hamid also has the added burden of being nagged by his father to settle down and marry and by the abrupt withdrawal of support by a gym owner who once encouraged his progress. The Afghan national team arrives in Bahrain for the Mr. Asia event, but the more flamboyant competitors from other countries overshadow them.

== Production ==
Afghan Muscles is the first feature-length film directed by Danish filmmaker Andreas Møl Dalsgaard (born 1980), who received a BA in social anthropology from the University of Aarhus and became a student director at the National Film School of Denmark in 2005. Dalsgaard became interested in the subject during a 2003 visit to Kabul, when he noticed large posters of scantily clad male bodybuilders around the Afghan capital. Dalsgaard spent three years following a group of bodybuilders for the film, which he later described as "a culture of young men seeking modernity in their very own way, trying to be successful and gain a name and fame in the cultural chaos of postwar Kabul."

== Release ==
During a presentation of Afghan Muscles at the 2007 AFI Fest, Dalsgaard acknowledged that his film intentionally avoided highlighting any involvement by Afghan women in bodybuilding, either as athletes or audience members. "It's men looking at men," he stated.

Afghan Muscles shared the 2007 AFI Fest Grand Jury Prize for Documentary with Operation Filmmaker, directed by Nina Davenport. The film also played in festivals in the U.S., Europe and the Middle East. Afghan Muscles has been released in the U.S. on DVD by Cinema Guild.

== See also ==
- The Bodybuilder and I
