= Andreas Dalsgaard =

Danish filmmaker

Andreas Dalsgaard (born 1980) is a film producer and director, known primarily for his documentary films. He is a founding partner and CEO of Elk Film, a production company based in Copenhagen, where he develops and produces documentary films, series and fictional adaptations.

His directorial credits include Afghan Muscles (2006), which received the Grand Jury Prize at AFI Fest; Cities on Speed: Bogotá Change (2009); Traveling With Mr. T (2012); The Human Scale (2012); Life Is Sacred (2015); The War Show (2016), which won the Venice Days Award and The Great Game (2018). His 2009 graduation film, København, won first prize at the CILECT awards in 2010. In 2026, he directed the documentary series The Oligarch and the Art Dealer, whose pilot premiered at the Sundance Film Festival.

As a producer, Dalsgaard's credits include The Lost Leonardo (2021), which was distributed internationally by Sony Pictures Classics; As the Tide Comes In (2023), which received nominations for the Robert and Bodil awards; Daughter of Genghis (2024), which premiered at CPH:DOX; Perfect Road (2026), which premiered at the Zurich Film Festival and Rescue (2026), which premiered at the Toronto International Film Festival.

== Early life and education ==
Dalsgaard studied anthropology at the University of Aarhus, where he earned a bachelor's degree in anthropology in 2003. He studied visual anthropology at Paris Diderot University (Université Denis Diderot Paris VII), receiving a degree in 2004. He graduated from the National Film School of Denmark as a fiction film director in 2009.

== Career ==
Dalsgaard made his directorial debut with the documentary Afghan Muscles, which received Grand Jury Prize at AFI Fest in Los Angeles. Shot in 2004, the film examines bodybuilding culture in Afghanistan and offers a view of the country through the sport and its participants.

Dalsgaard's 2009 graduation film in the Danish Film School, København, won first prize at the CILECT (International Film School Award) in 2010. His directing documentary work also includes Cities on Speed: Bogotá Change (2009), the docufiction Travelling with Mr. T. (2012) and Life Is Sacred (2015). He was also a writer and director the documentary film The Human Scale (2013), which examines urban design and the relationship between cities and human interaction.

Dalsgaard co-founded the production company Elk Film with editor Nicolás Nørgaard Staffolani in 2013. He serves as its chief executive officer.

In 2016, Dalsgaard co-wrote and directed the documentary film The War Show, which follows Syrian radio host Obaidah Zytoon and her friends during the Syrian war. The film was screened at Venice Days, winning Venice Days Award at the Venice Film Festival. The film was subsequently screened at the Toronto International Film Festival and IDFA, and was nominated for Best Danish Documentary at the Robert Awards.

In 2018, Dalsgaard directed The Great Game, a documentary following film producer Michael Haslund as he takes his father, Søren Haslund-Christensen, who has Alzheimer's disease, on a journey through China in the footsteps of his grandfather, explorer Henning Haslund-Christensen. It premiered at CPH:DOX in Copenhagen, where it competed for the festival's DOX:AWARD.

In 2021, Dalsgaard produced Andreas Koefoed's documentary The Lost Leonardo for Elk Film, alongside Christoph Jörg of Pumpernickel Film. The film explores the history of Leonardo da Vinci's painting Salvator Mundi and its record-breaking auction sale and subsequent questions over its authenticity. It was sold by Dogwoof to Sony Pictures Classics for distribution in multiple territories.

In 2023, Variety reported that Dalsgaard was involved in several documentary projects at Elk Film. These included Afghan Circus, directed by Camille Bildsøe, which was in late development and moving into production.

Dalsgaard served as executive producer and idea initiator on the documentary As the Tide Comes In (Danish: Før stormen), directed by Juan Palacios and co-directed by Sofie Husum Johannesen. The film premiered in the international competition program at the International Documentary Film Festival Amsterdam (IDFA) in 2023. It was nominated for Best Documentary at 42nd Roberts Award and 2025 Bodili Awards.

In 2024, Dalsgaard produced the Danish documentary Daughter of Genghis for Elk Film. The film follows Gerel Byamba, the leader of the ultranationalist female-only movement Gerel Khas in Mongolia, and examines the rise of right-wing extremism in the country. Directed by Kristoffer Juel Poulsen and Christian Als, the film had its world premiere in the F competition at CPH in Copenhagen, and Taskovski Films acquired its worldwide rights.

Speaking about Daughter of Genghis, Dalsgaard said he hoped the film would challenge clichéd portrayals of Mongolia as "an exotic nation of nomads and eagle hunters" by exploring contemporary questions of nationhood and indigenous nomadic identity.

Dalsgaard was a co-producer feature documentary Hacking Hate, which premiered at the 2024 Tribeca Festival and won Best Documentary Competition.

In 2026, Dalsgaard directed the three-part documentary series The Oligarch and the Art Dealer, co-created with Christoph Jörg. The series examines the legal dispute between Swiss art dealer Yves Bouvier and Russian businessman Dmitry Rybolovlev over artworks and their transactions. Its pilot episode premiered at the Sundance Film Festival, while the complete series had its world premiere at CPH:DOX. It was also presented at Canneseries.

In an 2026 interview with Cineuropa about The Oligarch and the Art Dealer, Dalsgaard said that his work on The Lost Leonardo, opened his eyes to the dispute between Rybolovlev and Bouvier. He further said that Bouvier's willingness to tell his side of the story allowed them to "talk about the secretive world of the ultra-rich, power and privilege, and some of the greatest artworks in history".

In the same 2026 interview with Cineuropa, he discussed balancing information and entertainment in The Oligarch and the Art Dealer:

The real fun lies in exploring art deals, so explanations and the entertainment value go hand in hand. I’ve always loved films that inform me while being blatantly entertaining... it was tricky to keep it playful and dynamic without confusing the audience. We had to tell a story where they get all of the facts, while many people on the screen are trying to manipulate them.

Dalsgaard produced on Perfect Road, a documentary directed by Adam and Christian Bonke that follows cyclist Maximilian Schnell on a journey through Europe's mountain passes. The film premiered at the Zurich Film Festival and screened at the BFI London Film Festival in 2026.

He produced documentary film Rescue, which follows a Yemeni mother seeking to reunite her family after being separated from her husband during a Mediterranean rescue operation and subsequently held in Libya. The documentary was filmed aboard the Geo Barents, a rescue vessel operated by Médecins Sans Frontières. It premiered at the Toronto International Film Festival before screening in the Now/Future section of the Zurich Film Festival.

== Filmography ==
| Year | Title | Producing | Directing | Writing | Notes | Ref |
|---|---|---|---|---|---|---|
| 2006 | Afghan Muscles | No | Yes | No | Director | |
| 2007 | The Italian Doctor | Yes | No | No | Producer; television film | |
| 2009 | Cities on Speed: Bogotá Change | No | Yes | No | Director | |
| 2009 | København | No | Yes | Yes | Short film; screenplay | |
| 2012 | Traveling with Mr. T. | No | Yes | No | Director | |
| 2012 | The Human Scale | Yes | Yes | Yes | Associate producer; director and writer | |
| 2014 | Life Is Sacred | No | Yes | Yes | Director and writer | |
| 2014 | Redane | No | Yes | No | Short film | |
| 2016 | The War Show | No | Yes | Yes | Writer | |
| 2017 | Denmark by the Ganges | Yes | No | No | Producer | |
| 2018 | The Great Game | No | Yes | Yes | Writer | |
| 2021 | The Lost Leonardo | Yes | No | Yes | Producer; writer | |
| 2023 | Før stormen | Yes | No | No | Creative and executive producer | |
| 2024 | Daughter of Genghis | Yes | No | No | Producer | |
| 2024 | Hacking Hate | Yes | No | No | Co-producer | |
| 2025 | An Eye for an Eye | Yes | No | No | Co-producer | |
| 2026 | If Luck Will Come | Yes | No | No | Executive producer | |
| 2026 | American Doctor | Yes | No | No | Executive producer | |
| 2026 | The Oligarch and the Art Dealer | Yes | Yes | Yes | Executive producer; creator and writer | |
| 2026 | Rescue | Yes | No | No | Producer | |
| 2026 | Perfect Road | Yes | No | No | Producer and executive producer | |
