= Warren Adelson =

American art historian

Warren Adelson (born 1942) is an American art dealer, art historian, and author specializing in 19th and 20th-century American painting as well as contemporary art.

== Biography ==
Adelson was born in Brookline, Massachusetts, the son of Beaze (née Gellar) and Harry Adelson.

He opened his first gallery in Boston in 1965 on Newbury Street, Boston. Adelson Galleries exhibited Boston Impressionists, 19th-century American landscape and figure painting, and contemporary art.

In 1972, Adelson joined Knoedler Galleries in New York, where he worked on the development of their American paintings department for one year.

In 1974, he joined Coe Kerr Gallery in New York and became a partner with the principal owner, R. Frederick Woolworth, the following year. There, he organized exhibitions and catalogues of American Impressionist painters including Mary Cassatt: An American Observer, Maurice Prendergast: The Remembered Image, John Singer Sargent: His Own Work, and Sargent at Broadway: The Impressionist Years. He also produced several exhibitions of new work by Jamie Wyeth, as well as the exhibition, "Portraits of Each Other, 1976," which featured images of Andy Warhol and Jamie Wyeth. The exhibition traveled to many museums throughout America and drew large crowds.

In 1990, Adelson re-established Adelson Galleries in New York and continued to specialize in 19th and 20th-century American art. The gallery regularly exhibits works by artists such as George Bellows, Charles Burchfield, Mary Cassatt, William Merritt Chase, Thomas Eakins, Childe Hassam, Winslow Homer, John Marin, Georgia O'Keeffe, Maurice Prendergast, John Singer Sargent, and Andrew Wyeth, among others. In addition, Adelson Galleries represents several contemporary artists including Jacob Collins, Andrew Stevovich, and Jamie Wyeth.

Under his direction, Adelson Galleries has produced numerous exhibitions and books, including Sargent Abroad: Figures and Landscapes, From the Artist's Studio: Unknown Prints and Drawings by Mary Cassatt, Maurice Prendergast: Paintings of America, Andrew Wyeth: Helga on Paper, Sargent's Venice, Frederic Edwin Church: Romantic Landscapes and Seascapes, Jamie Wyeth: Seven Deadly Sins, Mary Cassatt: Prints and Drawings from the Collection of Ambroise Vollard, John Marin: The Late Oils. and Sargent and Impressionism. Many of these exhibitions included paintings on loan from distinguished public collections such as the Metropolitan Museum of Art, NY, the Museum of Fine Arts, Boston, the Los Angeles County Museum of Art, and the Royal Academy, London. Sargent's Venice was conceived and organized by Adelson Galleries and traveled to the Museo Correr in Venice, 2007.

== John Singer Sargent ==
Adelson is an internationally recognized authority on John Singer Sargent, and he initiated scholarship on the John Singer Sargent Catalogue Raisonné in 1980 in partnership with the artist's great-nephew, Richard L. Ormond. The first seven volumes of the Catalog Raisonné have been published by the Yale University Press. The two final volumes will follow, vol. 8 in 2014, and vol. 9 in 2016.

Volume IV of the Catalogue Raisonné was awarded First Place for Scholarly and Reference Books at the 2007 New York Book Show Awards and chosen by Choice magazine as an Outstanding Academic Title from 2007. Adelson was also among the noted Sargent scholars who authored Sargent Abroad: Figures and Landscapes. His recent publication, Sargent's Venice, won the Award of Merit at the 2007 New York Book Show and a rating of "Outstanding" from the 2007 University Press Books Committee.

Adelson has lectured extensively on Sargent at institutions including The Metropolitan Museum of Art, New York; the Los Angeles County Museum of Art; the Minneapolis Institute of Art; the Denver Art Museum; the High Museum, Atlanta; and the Corcoran Gallery of Art, Washington, DC.

== Andrew Wyeth ==
Adelson has maintained a four-decade relationship with Andrew Wyeth and his family in concert with Wyeth's principal dealer, Frank E. Fowler, of Lookout Mountain, Tennessee. In November 2006, Adelson and Fowler presented the exhibition, Andrew Wyeth, Helga on Paper at the New York gallery (then at 19 East 82nd Street).

== Awards and honors ==
Adelson holds a bachelor's degree and a master's degree in Art History from Boston University.

From 1986 to 2001, Adelson served as a board member to the Art Advisory Panel of the Internal Revenue Service in Washington, DC. From 1997 to 2002, he served on the Museum of Modern Art's Advisory Committee on Museum Archives, Library, and Research. In January 2006 he was elected to the board of trustees of the Smithsonian Archives of American Art. He also currently serves as the Chair of Boston University's College of Arts and Sciences Dean's Leadership Advisory Board.

== Personal ==
Adelson lives in New York with his wife, Jan Peterson Adelson. Jan is chairman of The Board of the Hudson River Museum, Yonkers, NY, past chair of Lyndhurst, a National Trust Historic Site in Tarrytown, NY and served as secretary on the Board of Historic Hudson Valley. Jan and Warren have worked together at Adelson Galleries since 1990. Jan previously worked for Curry Fine Art and at the Ankrum Gallery in Los Angeles in the late 1970s early 1980s and assisted the painter, Shirl Goedike.

They have three children, Alan, Adam, and Alexa. Alan is employed by Adelson Galleries, New York. Adam is the Director of Adelson Galleries Boston, along with Alexa, the assistant director. Warren also has a son, Dr. Harry Adelson of Park City, Utah, by a previous marriage.

== See also ==
- The Lost Leonardo, 2021 film in which Adelson is interviewed
