= Fridthjof Film =

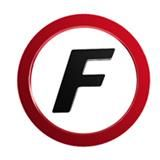
- Industry: Motion Picture
- Founded: 2000
- Headquarters: Copenhagen, Denmark
- Key people: Ronnie Fridthjof
- Products: Film
- Website: f-film.com

Fridthjof Film is a Danish film production company founded by Ronnie Fridthjof in 2000.

== History ==
The company was founded by Ronnie Fridthjof in 2000. Its first productions were documentaries. Since 2008, it has also produced feature films.

== Notable productions ==
The company is internationally most notable for the award-winning documentary Armadillo. Its feature films have all been comedies featuring prominent Danish stand-up comedians among the cast members. The company has also produced the television series A-klassen, which was nominated for a Robert Award for best television series in 2013.

== Filmography ==
=== Feature films ===
- Blå mænd (2008)
- Julefrokosten (2009)
- Alle for én (2011)
- Alle for to (2013)
- Kolbøttefabrikken (2014)
- In War and Love (2018)

=== Documentary films ===
- Armadillo (2010)
- Mercy Mercy (2012)
- Adoptionens Pris (2012)
- The War Show (2016)
