= Andrew Stevovich =

American painter

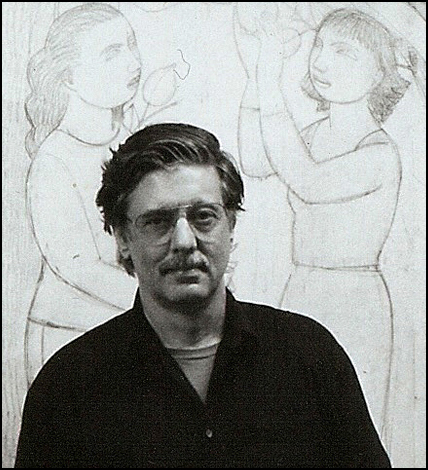
- Andrew Stevovich in his studio, April 2001
- Born: 1948 (age 77–78); Salzburg, Austria
- Known for: Painting
- Website: andrewstevovich.com

Andrew Stevovich (/ˈstɛvəvɪtʃ/ STEV-ə-vitch; born 1948) is an American painter. He is best known for oil paintings and pastels that combine abstract formalities with a figurative narrative. He has also produced lithographs, etchings, and wood-block prints.

== Biography ==
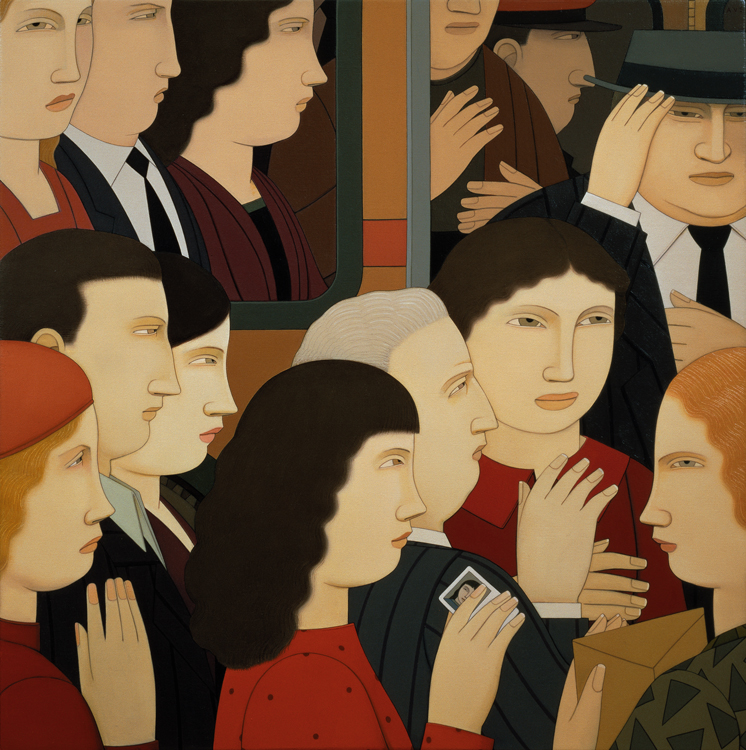
Bus Stop, oil on linen (24" x 24") 2001. Private collection.

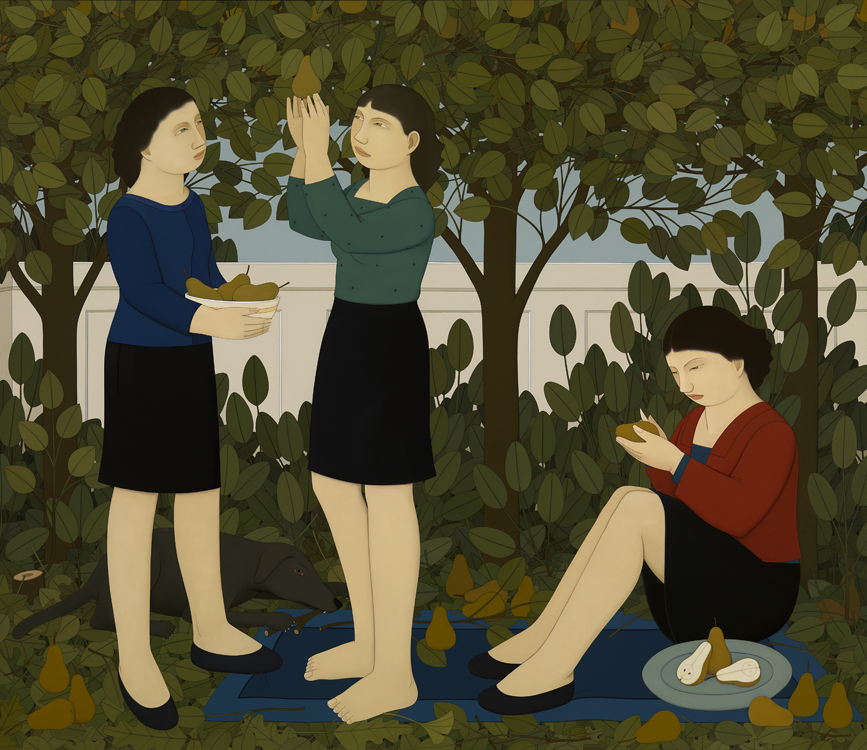
In the Garden, oil on linen (62" x 72") 2006–2007. Private collection.

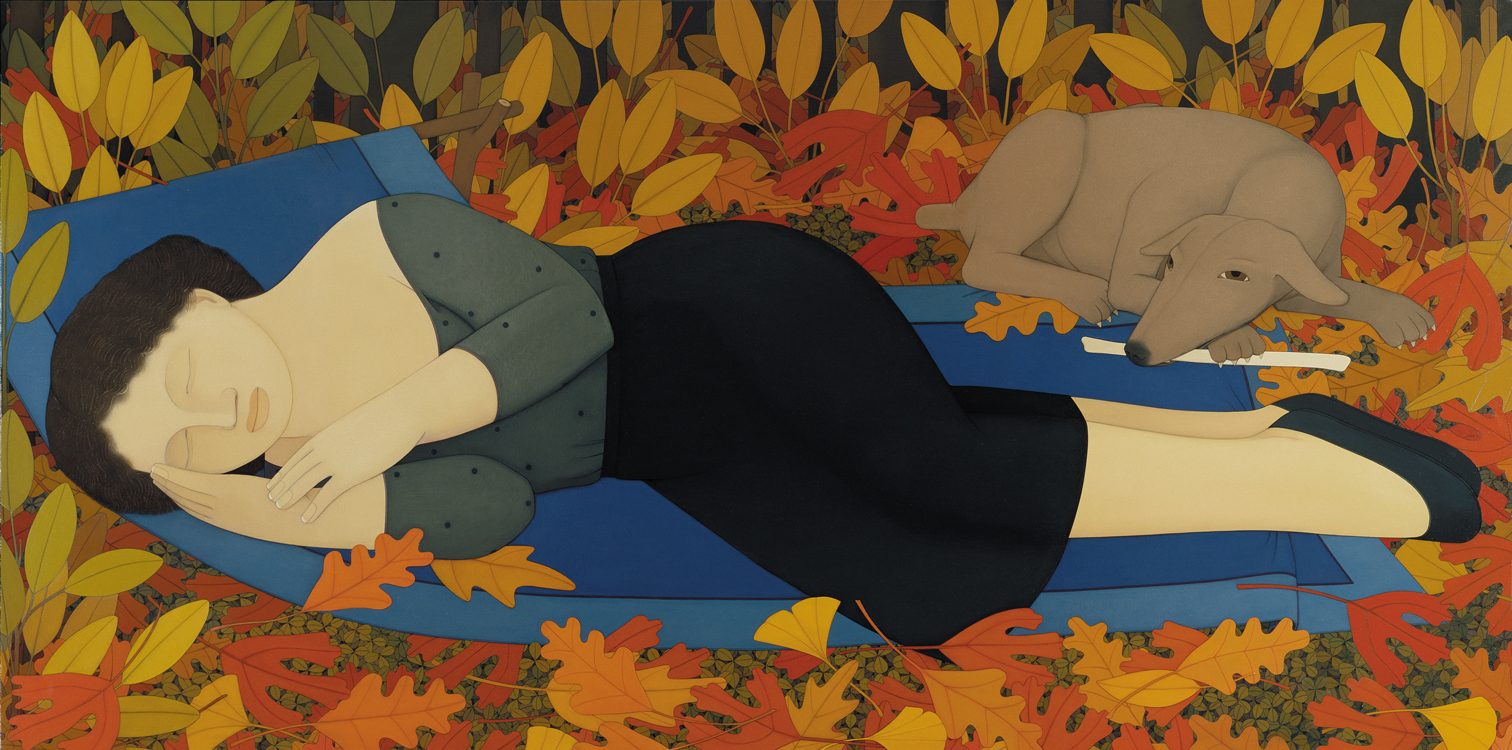
Woman with Autumn Leaves, oil on linen (36" x 72") 1994. Private collection.

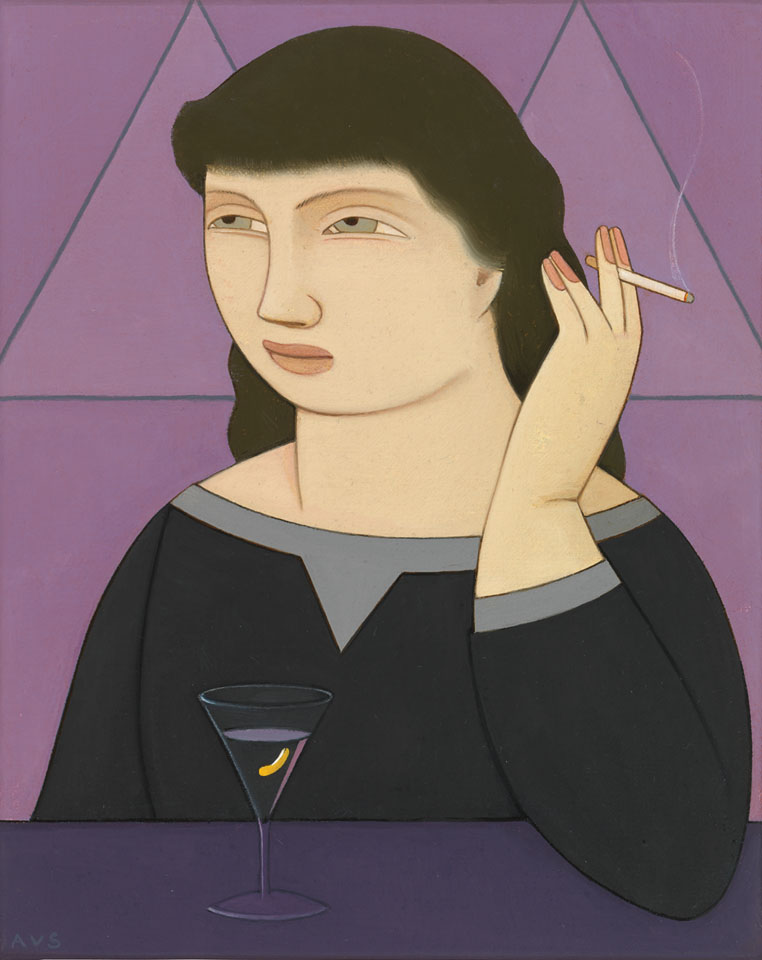
Woman Smoking: Eliza, oil on linen (7" x 6") 2009. Private collection.

Stevovich was born in Austria in 1948, coming to the United States with his family in 1950. He grew up in Washington, D.C. and graduated from the Rhode Island School of Design in 1970. He earned his Masters in Fine Arts from the Massachusetts College of Art and Design. His first solo exhibition took place in 1971 at the Alpha Gallery in Boston, Massachusetts. Since 1981, he has been represented by Warren Adelson in New York City, first at the Coe Kerr Gallery and after 1991 at the Adelson Galleries.

A retrospective exhibition took place at the Danforth Museum in Framingham, Massachusetts, in 1999. In 2008–2009, another retrospective, The Truth About Lola, curated by Bartholomew Bland, took place at the Hudson River Museum in Yonkers, New York, and traveled to the Boca Raton Museum of Art, Florida.

Stevovich's work is in numerous public collections, including the Boston Museum of Fine Arts, the Danforth Museum, the DeCordova Museum, the New Britain Museum of American Art, and the Portland Museum of Art in Maine.

Major influences on the development of his work include Giotto, Duccio, Sassetta, Fra Angelico and other early Italian artists, as well as Paul Gauguin and German Expressionists such as Erich Heckel.

His work has been described by John Sacret Young as a "successful fusion of the classicism of the Flemish and Italian Renaissance painters to his contemporary subject matter." The art critic, Carol Diehl wrote:

Obsessed with paring down compositions to their essential elements, Stevovich has a passion for simplicity. At the same time, he's also fascinated by complexity—pattern and repetition—which, by its nature, requires a plethora of shapes or images. His work, therefore, is all about the marriage of these opposites.

Stevovich lives and works in Massachusetts.

== Beasts and Citizens ==
In 2000, Stevovich created a series of eight etchings for Beasts and Citizens, a limited edition book of forty fables by Jean de La Fontaine, translated from the French by Craig Hill. One hundred and thirty-five copies were printed and bound with the etchings. The images were loosely based on the fables Discord, The Lion's Share, The Fox and the Grapes, The Mountain That Labored, The Swallow and the Nightingale, Doctors, The Two Bulls and the Frog, and The Cat Who Became a Woman.

== Selected solo exhibitions ==
- Adelson Galleries: New York, New York 1992, 1995, 1999, 2001, 2004, 2007, 2010, 2015, 2022
- Adelson Galleries Boston: Boston, Massachusetts 2012, 2015, 2018
- Alpha Gallery: Boston, Massachusetts 1971, 1973, 1976, 1978
- Boca Raton Museum of Art: Boca Raton, Florida 2009
- Coe Kerr Gallery: New York, New York 1983, 1985, 1987, 1990
- Clark Gallery, Lincoln, Massachusetts 2007, 2021, 2024
- Danforth Museum of Art: Framingham, Massachusetts 1999, 2007
- Greenville County Museum of Art: Greenville, South Carolina 2020
- Hudson River Museum: Yonkers, New York 2008 – 2009
- Little Center Gallery: Clark University, Worcester, Massachusetts 1980
- Mitsukoshi Gallery: Ebisu, Tokyo, Japan 1996
- New Britain Museum of American Art: New Britain, Connecticut 1975
- Pisa Galleries: Tokyo, Japan 1992
- Tatistcheff-Rogers Gallery: Santa Monica, California 1989, 1993
- Terrence Rogers Fine Art: Santa Monica, California 2000
- Virginia Lynch Gallery: Tiverton, Rhode Island 1992, 2002

== Publications ==
=== Books about Andrew Stevovich ===
- Adelson, Warren (2007). Andrew Stevovich: Petals on a Bough. New York: Adelson Galleries. ISBN 978-0-9741621-6-4. "Andrew Stevovich."
- Bland, Bartholomew (2008). Andrew Stevovich: The Truth about Lola. New York: Hudson River Museum. ISBN 978-0-943651-37-8.
- Botwinick, Michael (2020). Andrew Stevovich: Beyond the Figure. Milan: Skira Editore. ISBN 978-88-572-4239-2.
- Diehl, Carol; Shreve, Anita (2007). Andrew Stevovich: Essential Elements. Lenox: Hard Press Editions. ISBN 978-1-889097-70-1.
- Gardner, James (2010). Andrew Stevovich: Alternate Universe. New York: Adelson Galleries.
- Poras, E. Linda; Crusan, Ron (1999). Andrew Stevovich. Framingham, Massachusetts: Danforth Museum.

=== Selected reviews and texts ===
- Bergeron, Chris (October 25, 2007). "Uncomfortably Numb" MetroWest Daily News (Massachusetts). Retrieved 15 December 2013.
- Cohen, Ronny (April 1990). "Andrew Stevovich". Artforum (New York).
- Gardner, James (October 18, 2007). "The Dispassionate Perfectionist". New York Sun. Retrieved 15 December 2013.
- Garnett, Adrienne (Winter 2008–2009). "Outside, Inside, Future, Then, and Now". Art of the Times (Florida).
- Genocchio, Benjamin (December 19, 2008). "From an Observer Who Misses Little, Lavish Details". The New York Times. Retrieved 15 December 2013.
- Kologe, Brian R. (May 1980). "Andrew V. Stevovich". Art New England, vol.1, no. 6.
- Nigrosh, Leon (September 10–16, 1999). "The Abstract, Alternate World of Andrew Stevovich" Worcester Phoenix (Massachusetts). Retrieved 15 December 2013.
- Stapen, Nancy (February 1982). "Andrew Stevovich". Art New England, vol.3, no. 3.
- Taylor, Robert (January 10, 1982). "Stevovich Conveys Today's Edginess and Ambiguity". The Boston Globe.
- Temin, Christine (October 6, 1999). "Incredible Lightness of Stevovich". The Boston Globe.
