= Andreas Johnsen =

- Born: 1974; Copenhagen
- Occupation: Film maker

Andreas Johnsen (born 1974) is a Danish documentary director, producer, cinematographer. He is best known for the film Ai Weiwei The Fake Case (2013), about the Chinese artist and activist's life and battle against charges placed against him by the Chinese government. Johnsen's films often look at social issues in many different parts of the world, including Kidd Life (2012), about the Danish rapper and YouTube star Nicholas Westwood Kidd, and Man Ooman (2008), which looks at sex and gender relations in Jamaica through dancehall culture. In 2014, the Danish Film Critics Association granted him the Bodil Award for Best Documentary.

== Documentary ==
- Mr. Catra: The Faithful (2004)
- Inside Outside (2005)
- Curtain Raising: Musicians in East Africa (2006)
- Good Copy Bad Copy (2007)
- Natasja (2008)
- Man Ooman (2008)
- Mord – as Andreas Rosforth Johnsen (2009)
- A Kind of Paradise (2011)
- Kidd Life (2012)
- Ai Weiwei The Fake Case (2013)
- Bugs (2016)

== Awards ==
- 2014, Bodil Award for Best Documentary
