= Bill Friedman =

American casino designer and consultant

- Occupation: Casino designer
- Notable work: Designing Casinos to Dominate the Competition

Bill Friedman is an American casino designer, author, and consultant. Considered a pioneer in modern gambling, he is credited with transforming Las Vegas into a slot machine-oriented gambling destination.

== Career ==
Friedman got his start in the casino industry as a gambling addict, which led him to turn his personal expertise into lucrative work as a casino manager. He managed the Castaways Hotel and Casino and the Silver Slipper. He has also been a consultant on numerous other casinos and resorts, including The Mirage.

As an academic with a focus on addiction psychology, Friedman taught the first course in casino management at the University of Nevada, Las Vegas. He has been credited with introducing many aspects of cognitive psychology into the design of casinos and resorts, with a design philosophy oriented around maze-like casino floors with low ceilings, no windows, and no clocks. This was the standard for casinos in Nevada until the creation of Bellagio, where designer Roger Thomas adopted the opposite philosophy for interior design. Friedman's ideas have been linked to later developments in social media such as infinite scrolling.

== Bibliography ==
- Casino Management (1974)
- Casino Games (1995)
- Designing Casinos to Dominate the Competition (2000)
- All Against The Law (2014)
- 30 Illegal Years To The Strip: The Untold Stories of the Gangsters Who Built The Early Las Vegas Strip (2015)
