= Georgina Adam =

British journalist, public speaker, art market expert and author

Georgina Adam is a journalist, public speaker, art market expert and author.

She has been a Financial Times contributor and art market editor-at-large of The Art Newspaper where she began her career as a journalist in the late 80's. She lectures at the Sotheby's Institute in London. She is a member of the International Association of Art Critics and The International Art Market Studies Association. Adam also serves as the chair of the Art Business Conference.

Adam's book, Big Bucks: The Explosion of the Art Market in the 21st Century (2014), discusses big art dealers in a frank, unflinching manner. She also explains how the art market works and how art is rated and valued. Adam's second book, Dark Side of the Boom (Lund Humphries, December 2017), scrutinizes the excesses of the 21st-century contemporary art market explosion. The Telegraph called Dark Side of the Boom a "'must read' for anyone with an interest in the relationship between art and money. It covers buying of art as an investment, the flourishing art storage sector, temptations to forgery and fraud, tax evasion, money laundering, the upheavals in auction houses and the impact of the enhanced use of financial instruments on art transactions. She also looks at whether big money is eroding creativity in art. In the wake of the Panama Papers revelations, she incorporates examples of the way tax havens have been used to stash art transactions – and ownership – away from public scrutiny.

Adam has spoken about a "1–4 per cent rule", which indicates people generally do not spend more than that amount of their net worth on an individual piece of artwork or a 'passion investment'.

== Books ==
- Big Bucks: The explosion of the art market in the 21st Century (Lund Humphries, 2014) ISBN 978-1848221383
- Dark Side of the Boom: The Excesses Of The Art Market In The 21st Century (Paperback – 1 February 2018) ISBN 978-1848222205 Published in Chinese, in French as La Face Cachée du Marché de l'Art (Editions Beaux-Arts) and in Italian as L'inarrestabile ascesa dei musei privati (Johan-Levi)
- The Rise and Rise of the Private Art Museum (Lund Humphries, Sotheby's Institute of Art, Hardback, 30 September 2021) ISBN 978-1848223844. Published in French as L'essor des musées privés dans le monde, (Editions Beaux Arts, 2024)
- NextGen collectors and the Art Market (Lund Humphries, Sotheby's Institute of Art, hardback, (March 2026) ISBN 978-1-84822-706-4. 2026

== See also ==
- The Lost Leonardo, 2021 film in which Adam is interviewed
