= Hotel design =

Planning, drafting, design and development of hotels

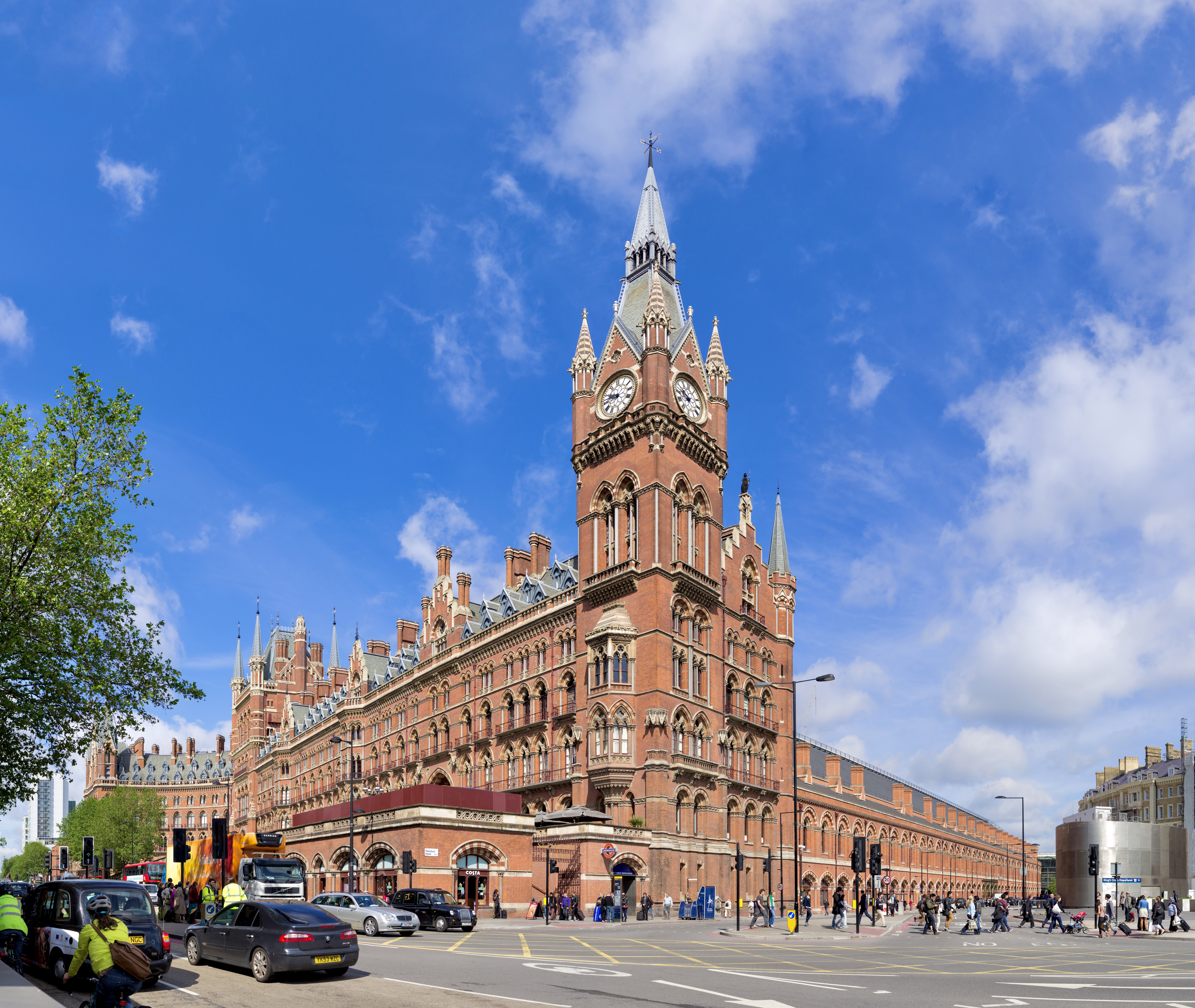
The Midland Grand Hotel was the result of an architectural design competition. The winning design was a grandiose Gothic Revival style by Sir George Gilbert Scott.

Hotel design involves the planning, drafting, design and development of hotels. The concept of hotel design is rooted in traditions of hospitality to travellers dating back to ancient times, and the development of many diverse types of hotels has occurred in many cultures. For example, the advent of rail travel in the early 1900s led to the planning, design and development of hotels near railroad stations that catered to rail travelers. Hotels around Grand Central Terminal in New York City are an example of this phenomenon. Hotel interior design and styles are very diverse, with numerous variations existent.

== Types of hotels ==
Numerous types of hotel designs exist in the world. Examples of hotel designs include guest palaces across Asia, English country inns, hotel-casino resorts, designer and art hotels, hotel-spa resorts, boutique hotels, "no-frills" hotels that offer very basic amenities at budget rates, basic rooming houses, monasteries offering refuge and spare bedrooms rented out in ordinary homes. Another type is capsule hotels, which are offered in Japan as an option for those who just need the basic necessities during their stay. Historically, the development of lodging areas and facilities was sometimes driven by their physical locations, such as at river crossings, at major trading posts or in locations lending themselves to defense, such as forts or castles. Property location continues to be a key consideration in hotel design in contemporary times. Many hotels throughout the United States cater to either tourists or residents. Visitors of the hotel have the options ranging from renting a room for one night or renting a suite for a month. Though residential hotels are not as popular today as they were in the past, they still provide a significant number of America's homes.

== Professional design ==
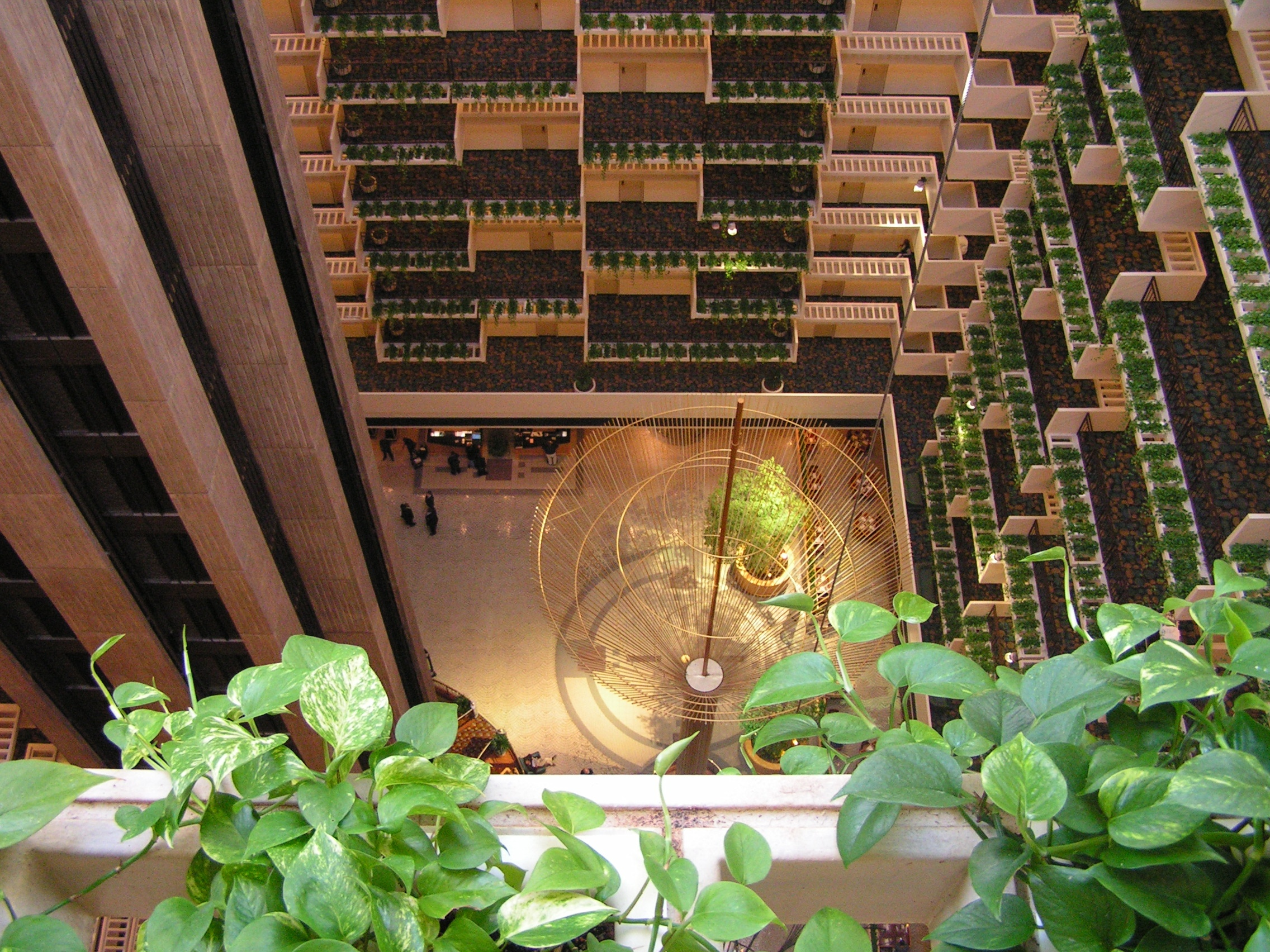
The palm court of the 19th century was reinvented by John Portman who created an influential design of grand atrium for the Hyatt Regency Atlanta in 1967.

Contemporary hotel design can be sophisticated and functional, involving specialist architects and designers, environmental and structural engineers, interior designers and skilled contractors and suppliers, particularly for large, intricate projects. Hotel design can involve the refurbishment of an existing building already used for lodging, the conversion of a building previously used for another purpose or the construction of new buildings.

Hotel design involves planning regarding the estimated client needs for the facility along with the designers' vision. Hotel buildings may have several various functions, including restaurants, outdoor facilities and swimming pools, fitness centers and spas. Contemporary hotel design involves effectively integrating these various aspects of hotel operations within a location to minimize interference with one another. For example, hotel design includes considerations to avoid guests being inundated with excessive noise and the movement of people. Hotels are usually designed from the inside-out to ensure the practical functionality and relationship of its parts.

== Cultural influences ==
Hotel designers bring to their work their own cultural mores and need to understand the culture in which the hotel will operate if working outside their native environment. Due to travel becoming international in scope, links with local traditions in many hotel designs have been weakened, and ‘International’ has become a style in its own right. Some hotels base their operations with a theme of vernacular local traditional styles, while others have modernist stylistic designs.

Hotel design ranges from basic variables, such as the appropriate height for bed head light switches to the more specialized, such as the right layout for a kitchen or the sightlines from reception areas to enable control and protection of entry to rooms. The pace of change in hotel design has, as in most areas of modern life, increased with the development of innovative technology.

Despite cultural variations, hotels commonly function to provide a welcome environment that supports the comfort of its guests for work, rest and relaxation.

== Maintenance ==
Hotels are permanently undergoing maintenance or renovation work (roofing, furniture, electricity, entertainment options, new ecological standards), so a constant reorganization plan must be prepared.

== See also ==
- Hospitality industry
- Hotel manager
- Motel
