= The War Show =

- Directed by: Andreas Dalsgaard; Obaidah Zytoon
- Written by: Andreas Dalsgaard; Obaidah Zytoon
- Edited by: Adam Nielsen
- Music by: Colin Stetson
- Production company: Fridthjof Film
- Release date: 2016
- Countries: Syria; Denmark; Germany
- Language: Arabic

The War Show is a 2016 Syrian-Danish-German documentary film co-written and directed by Andreas Dalsgaard and Obaidah Zytoon. It was awarded best film in the Venice Days section at the 73rd edition of the Venice Film Festival.

The film recounts the Arab Spring days in Syria and the subsequent civil war though the eyes of a Syrian former radio DJ.
