= Scott L. Montgomery =

American geologist and writer

Scott L. Montgomery (born May 30, 1951) is an American author, geoscientist, public lecturer, and affiliate faculty member at the University of Washington in Seattle. He is widely known for his writings on energy matters, intellectual history, language and translation, and history of science.

His book, The Shape of the New: Four Big Ideas and How They Built the Modern World (2015), with co-author Daniel Chirot, was selected by The New York Times and Bloomberg Businessweek as one of the most notable books of 2015. His articles have appeared in many journals, including Forbes, Newsweek, History Today, Science, and Nature.

== Early life and education ==
Scott Lyons Montgomery was born on May 30, 1951, the son of Kay C. Montgomery and Shirley Lyons Montgomery, in Ithaca New York. His father was an experimental psychologist (PhD, University of Chicago, 1948), who had done research at Harvard and Cornell Universities before moving to Yale. An unfortunate series of incidents led to the father committing suicide in 1956. Scott and his brother, Bruce, were raised by their mother, eventually moving to Kensington, Maryland in the Washington D.C. area. She remarried In 1971, to Russell Allen.

Scott attended Walter Johnson High School in Bethesda, Maryland and then went to Knox College in Galesburg, Illinois. At Knox, he majored in chemistry for the first several years, spending a semester at the State University of New York at Stony Brook, then switched to English, graduating Phi Beta Kappa. He entered a PhD program in geological sciences at Cornell University, deciding to finish with an M.S. degree when his mother was diagnosed with terminal cancer. After her death in 1979, he moved to Japan, where he taught English in a private Tokyo academy and immersed himself in Japanese culture and language.

== Career ==
Returning to the U.S. in 1982, he found work in the energy industry as a petroleum geoscientist and as a translator of scientific material (Japanese to English). He worked both as an independent consulting geologist and writer/editor, performing contract work for companies, investors, energy funds, and other entities. During a stint with Petroleum Information Corp., and on a contract basis after leaving the company, he wrote a monograph series, Petroleum Frontiers, eventually completing 74 individual volumes. During a year with International Human Resources Development Corp. (IHRDC), he authored two textbooks, Structural Geology and Exploration for Marginal Marine Sandstones.

In 1995, he was selected by the American Association of Petroleum Geologists (AAPG) to author a new series of technical papers in the AAPG Bulletin titled "E&P [Exploration & Production] Notes." Between 1995 and 2002, Montgomery wrote approximately 50 of these papers, which gained a wide international readership and set a new standard for concise analyses of oil and gas plays. Many of these papers continue to be widely read two decades after they were published. He also contributed articles to various trade journals, special technical volumes, and symposia.

During this time, Montgomery began work as an independent scholar, publishing essays, articles, and books on themes that involved both science and the humanities. He continued his two careers for more than a decade, adding a third in 2004, becoming an affiliate faculty member in the Henry M. Jackson School of International Studies, University of Washington (Seattle). In 2008, he ceased work as a consulting geologist in the energy industry and expanded his teaching on energy-related subjects, climate change, English as a global language, and intellectual history. He was honored with the Jackson School Student Service teaching award in 2015.

== Writings ==
Montgomery's first book, Minds for the Making (1994) examined the history of science education in the U.S., as a subset of education generally and the social and culture debates that have surrounded it. His next two works, The Scientific Voice (1996) and The Moon and the Western Imagination (1998) dealt with topics in the language of science and the role of art and other imagery in scientific contexts. These were followed by Science and Translation: Movements of Knowledge Through Cultures and Time (2000). This proved to be a pioneering study on the central role of translation in the history of science. Translation scholar and professor of comparative literature Maria Tymoczko wrote in an essay-review for the journal Isis:

[H]is approach to the subject matter gives a new entryway into the large questions he tackles. His lens of investigation--translation--is a brilliant choice. There is a predisposition to believe--indeed, it is a myth assiduously cultivated by scientists--that science is somehow transparent to language and culture. By tracing the transformations of scientific knowledge as it is transferred from language to language and culture to culture through translation, Montgomery establishes the materialistic bases of science, as well as the dependency of science on language and other cultural frameworks...

The book has been translated into a number of languages and has been used as a text in courses taught at universities in North America, Europe, the Middle East, and East Asia (China, Japan, Korea).

More recently, Montgomery's Does Science Need a Global Language? offered a detailed, unparalleled look at the role of English as a global lingua franca in science today and what this means for the scientific community. Praised for its nuanced approach and use of history (discussing past lingua franca of science, such as Greek, Latin, Arabic, Chinese), the book has also been controversial because of its insistence that the global use of English has grown to the point where it is part of science itself, has more pros than cons, and should no longer be viewed as linked to the status and power of the U.S. At the same time, the book spends much space discussing the inequities and biases that have accompanied the rise of English, the impacts on other languages, and also the struggles that many non-anglophone scientists are forced to bear. In an essay-review published in Science, Yael Peled says that the book builds its case "on a comprehensive body of research not only in the history of science but also in linguistics," and that the book raises important questions about "the complex interplay between science, power, and language."

In 2015, Montgomery and co-author, Dan Chirot, also in the Jackson School of International Studies (University of Washington), published The Shape of the New: Four Big Ideas and How They Built the Modern World, a work of significant and growing influence. The main premise of this wide-ranging and well-written book is that ideas “do not merely matter; they matter immensely, as...the source for decisions and actions that have structured the modern world.” Whether ideas or a combination of other actors, especially individuals, desire for power, and the response to events, form the driving force(s) behind history has been a long-standing debate within the historical profession. According to Montgomery and Chirot, the role of ideas—those of the Enlightenment in particular—has been too often ignored or belittled in recent decades due to such tendencies as the preference for realpolitik explanations and blanket criticism of Enlightenment thought from left-wing academics who view such thought as the origin of most modern evils, especially colonialism, racism, genderism, etc.

Montgomery and Chirot, however, citing other scholars on this period, view the Enlightenment as a time of unending debate and diversity of thought, out of which ideas about individual freedom and rights, democracy, economic reality, scientific effort, and the need to reform society all emerged. Shape of the New takes up a vast territory of texts, institutions, speeches, events, and much more. Writing in the New York Times Book Review, Fareed Zakaria stated

They have to cover an immense range of material, from economics to evolution to Islamic fundamentalism. But they do so comprehensively, intelligently and with nuance and judiciousness. I was struck again and again by the extraordinary breadth, erudition and lucidity of this book.

Briefly put, the book examines four major domains of thought via fundamental thinkers: Adam Smith in economic freedom; Darwin in biology; Thomas Jefferson and Alexander Hamilton in democratic government; and Karl Marx in human equality. The treatment includes tracing the history of how these expanded in influence through the 19th and 20th century, examining their diverse impacts up to the present time. The authors' key point is that ideas like democratic freedom and economic liberty are no less alive and fought over today than 200 years ago, and this will not stop. Needless to say, this is no less true for Darwin and for Marx. As Zakaria notes, "For almost a century, hundreds of millions studied [Marx's] work as gospel. Powerful nations like the Soviet Union and Maoist China organized themselves around his theories. In most other societies, politics were defined and organized in opposition to his views."

After their chapters on these thinkers, the authors turn to reactions against them, in the form of religious fundamentalisms (Christianity and Islam), totalitarianism, fascism, and forms of reactionary rejection. A powerful argument is made that none of this is over and done with. On the contrary, the attacks on liberal democracy, economic freedom, Darwinian evolution, and equality are all ongoing realities. Shape of the New shows why this is the case.

The book also makes the argument that the humanities are necessary today because ideas are their "stock and trade." No one should emerge from a college education without having read and talked about Smith's Wealth of Nations or Darwin's Origin of Species, it states. This view may not be welcomed by everyone, but it makes more than a little sense.

Doubtless the most original chapter takes up the origins of what Spencer Weart, in the title of his 1988 his book, called Nuclear Fear (1988). Where Weart looked mainly at imagery and popular culture, Montgomery and Graham fill out the picture by examining the political, sociological, and philosophical dimension of how nuclear power became embodied with a variety of threats attached to anger and concern over government, corporate, and military power, environmental damage, and western society's self-destructive aspects.

== Bibliography ==
- Seeing the Light: The Case for Nuclear Power in the 21st Century, Cambridge University Press, 2017.
- The Shape of the New: Four Big Ideas and How They Built the Modern World, Princeton University Press, 2015.
- A History of Science in World Cultures: Voices of Knowledge, Routledge, 2015.
- Does Science Need a Global Language? English and the Future of Global Research, University of Chicago Press, 2013.
- Powers that Be: Global Energy for the 21st Century and Beyond, University of Chicago Press, 2010.
- Moon, Weldon Owen, 2009.
- The Chicago Guide to Communicating Science, first edition, University of Chicago Press, 2002 (ISBN 0-226-53485-5).
  - Second edition, University of Chicago press, 2017 (ISBN 978-0-226-14450-4).
- Science in Translation: Movements of Knowledge Through Cultures and Time, University of Chicago Press, 2002 (ISBN 0-226-53481-2).
- The Moon and the Western Imagination, University of Arizona Press, 1999 (ISBN 0-8165-1989-7).
- The Scientific Voice. Guilford Press, 1995 (ISBN 1-57230-019-1).
- Minds for the Making: The Role of Science in American Education, 1750-1990, Guilford Press, 1994 (ISBN 0-89862-188-7).
- Structural Geology, IHRDC, 1985.
- Exploration for Non Marine Sandstone Reservoirs, IHRDC, 1984.
