= Gasolin' (film) =

- Original film poster
- Directed by: Anders Østergaard
- Written by: Anders Østergaard
- Produced by: Jakob Høgel; Helle Winther Remfeldt
- Starring: Gasolin'
- Cinematography: Simon Plum
- Edited by: Anders Villadsen
- Music by: Gasolin'
- Distributed by: Sandrew Metronome
- Release date: 9 March 2006
- Running time: 92 minutes
- Country: Denmark
- Language: Danish

Gasolin' is a 2006 documentary film directed by Anders Østergaard.

The film is about the Danish rock band, Gasolin'. For the first time since they split up in 1978, the four band members reflect upon their career and why the band split up.

== Gasolin' ==
- Franz Beckerlee
- Wili Jønsson
- Kim Larsen
- Søren Berlev
