= The Lost Leonardo =

2021 documentary film

- Theatrical release poster
- Directed by: Andreas Koefoed
- Written by: Andreas Dalsgaard; Andreas Koefoed; Christian Kirk Muff; Duska Zagorac; Mark Monroe
- Produced by: Andreas Dalsgaard; Christoph Jörg
- Starring: Georgina Adam; Warren Adelson; Evan Beard; Yves Bouvier; Alexandra Bregman; Dianne Dwyer Modestini; Doug Patteson; Antoine Harari; Martin Kemp; David Kirkpatrick; Robert King Wittman; Alexander Parish; Jerry Saltz; Kenny Schachter; Robert Simon; Frank Zöllner
- Cinematography: Adam Jandrup
- Edited by: Nicolás Nørgaard Staffolani
- Music by: Sveinug Nygaard
- Production companies: Elk Film; Pumpernickle Films; Danish Film Institute; Swedish Film Institute; Nordic Film and TV Fund; Mika Media; Mitten Media; Alba Collis; Diamond Docs; Sky Arts
- Distributed by: Sony Pictures Classics; Dogwoof
- Release dates: June 13, 2021 (Tribeca); August 13, 2021 (United States); September 10, 2021 (United Kingdom)
- Running time: 95 minutes
- Countries: United States; United Kingdom; Denmark; France; Sweden
- Language: English
- Box office: $494,820

The Lost Leonardo is an internationally co-produced documentary film directed by Andreas Koefoed, released in 2021. It follows the discovery and successive sales of the painting the Salvator Mundi, allegedly a work by Leonardo da Vinci, an artist for whom there are only a few attributed works in existence. The film chronicles the dramatic increases in the painting's value from its original purchase in 2005 for $1,175 to its auction in 2017 for $450 million, when it became the most expensive artwork ever sold. The use of high-end artwork for hiding wealth, as well as the conflicts created by large commissions and other economic incentives, are explored in the film. It includes interviews with leading art experts and art critics on issues regarding the provenance and authenticity of the work.

Production was announced in late 2019 following the success of Ben Lewis's book The Last Leonardo: The Secret Lives of the World’s Most Expensive Painting. The film had its world premiere at the Tribeca Film Festival on June 13, 2021, and was released in the United States on August 13, 2021, by Sony Pictures Classics and in the United Kingdom on September 10, 2021, by Dogwoof. The film was widely praised by critics for its content, pacing and the portrayal of the subject as a thriller. A French-made film on the topic called The Saviour for Sale was also released at the same time.

In October 2022, StudioCanal announced a plan to develop the film into a limited series with The Picture Company and Entertainment360.

== Synopsis ==
The opening introduces two American art dealers, Alexander Parish and Robert Simon, who buy a painting titled "After Leonardo" at a 2005 auction in New Orleans for $1,175. Both think the work is a "sleeper", a painting by a much better artist than is realized, although neither considers it to be by Leonardo. They show it to the New York art restorer Dianne Modestini, who cleans away the overpainting and discovers that the position of a thumb has moved (i.e. pentimento), suggesting the painting is an original. She also finds that the lips are drawn with no line, a technique common to other paintings by Leonardo, which she takes as a sign that the painting is indeed his work. Modestini completes an extensive restoration of the work that lasts from 2005 to 2013. Parish and Simon engage art dealer Warren Adelson.

In 2008, they present the work to a curator at the National Gallery, Luke Syson, who asks five Leonardo experts (Note: The five experts invited by Luke Syson were: Carmen C. Bambach (Curator of Spanish and Italian Drawings, Metropolitan Museum of Art New York), David Alan Brown (Curator of Italian Painting, National Gallery of Art, Washington, D.C.), Maria Teresa Fiorio (Professor of Art History at the University of Milan, and Vice President of the Raccolta Vinciana, Milan), Martin Kemp (University of Oxford), and Pietro C. Marani (Professor of Art History at the Politecnico di Milano).) including Maria Teresa Fiorio and Martin Kemp to view the picture. Syson is ambiguous about whether they authenticated it, and Fiorio says she did not authenticate it. (Note: In 2019, The Art Newspaper reported that only two of the five experts were a "yes", one was a "no", and the remaining two were silent.) In 2011, Syson controversially includes it in a National Gallery exhibition of Leonardo's works with the label, "by Leonardo da Vinci". Sotheby's are immediately engaged to sell the painting, asking $200 million, but find little interest. Professor Bernd Lindemann of the Gemäldegalerie, Berlin, declined it, saying: "Most of the painting is a remake and this was, for me, the argument to say, 'No, this is not a painting for the Gemäldegalerie'". The Leonardo expert Frank Zöllner says: "You have the old parts of the painting which are original—these are by pupils—and the new parts of the painting, which look like Leonardo, but they are by the restorer. In some part, it's a masterpiece by Dianne Modestini". Modestini declines to disclose her financial interest, saying: "He [Simon] paid me generously".

The film introduces Yves Bouvier, a developer and owner of freeports, who explains how he has become an art dealer in his own right as a result of art that clients have deposited in his freeports around the world. The film explains how high-end art has become a tool for wealth management by people who need to be able to physically carry and secretly move large amounts of wealth around the world outside of the banking system. In 2013, Bouvier showed the painting to a Russian billionaire, Dmitry Rybolovlev, who engages him to purchase the work. Bouvier hires a professional poker player to negotiate with Sotheby's and agrees on a price of $83 million, but he tells Rybolovlev the price is $127.5 million. When Rybolovlev discovers the deception and realizes that there have been numerous other deceptions, he legally pursues Bouvier (in events known as Bouvier Affair), who tells the film he has since lost everything.

In 2017, Rybolovlev hires Christie's to sell his entire portfolio and they market the painting as the "male Mona Lisa" and create a promotional video that includes Leonardo DiCaprio. The painting breaks the previous record for an art sale, selling for $400 million, with an additional $50 million of commission to Christie's. Word leaks that the buyer is Mohammed bin Salman and that the painting is being kept on his yacht. The film switches to a 2019–20 Leonardo exhibition at the Louvre where the painting is expected to be shown. In advance of the exhibition, bin Salman visits the Louvre with Emmanuel Macron and a publication appears in the museum's shop that authenticates the painting as being by Leonardo. However, in a dramatic twist, the painting fails to appear at the exhibition and the publication is removed from the shop with the Louvre denying that it was an official Louvre publication. The film ends speculating that bin Salman pulled the painting as the Louvre would not show it alongside the Mona Lisa, (Note: The French-made 2021 film, The Saviour for Sale, had interviews with French government officials who had access to the Louvre's analysis and the Louvre's negotiations with Saudi officials. They said that the Louvre could only conclude that Leonardo had "contributed" to the painting, which bin Salman would not accept, hence his withholding the painting from display at the exhibition.) and that he was planning to show it in a new dedicated museum in Saudi Arabia.

== Cast ==
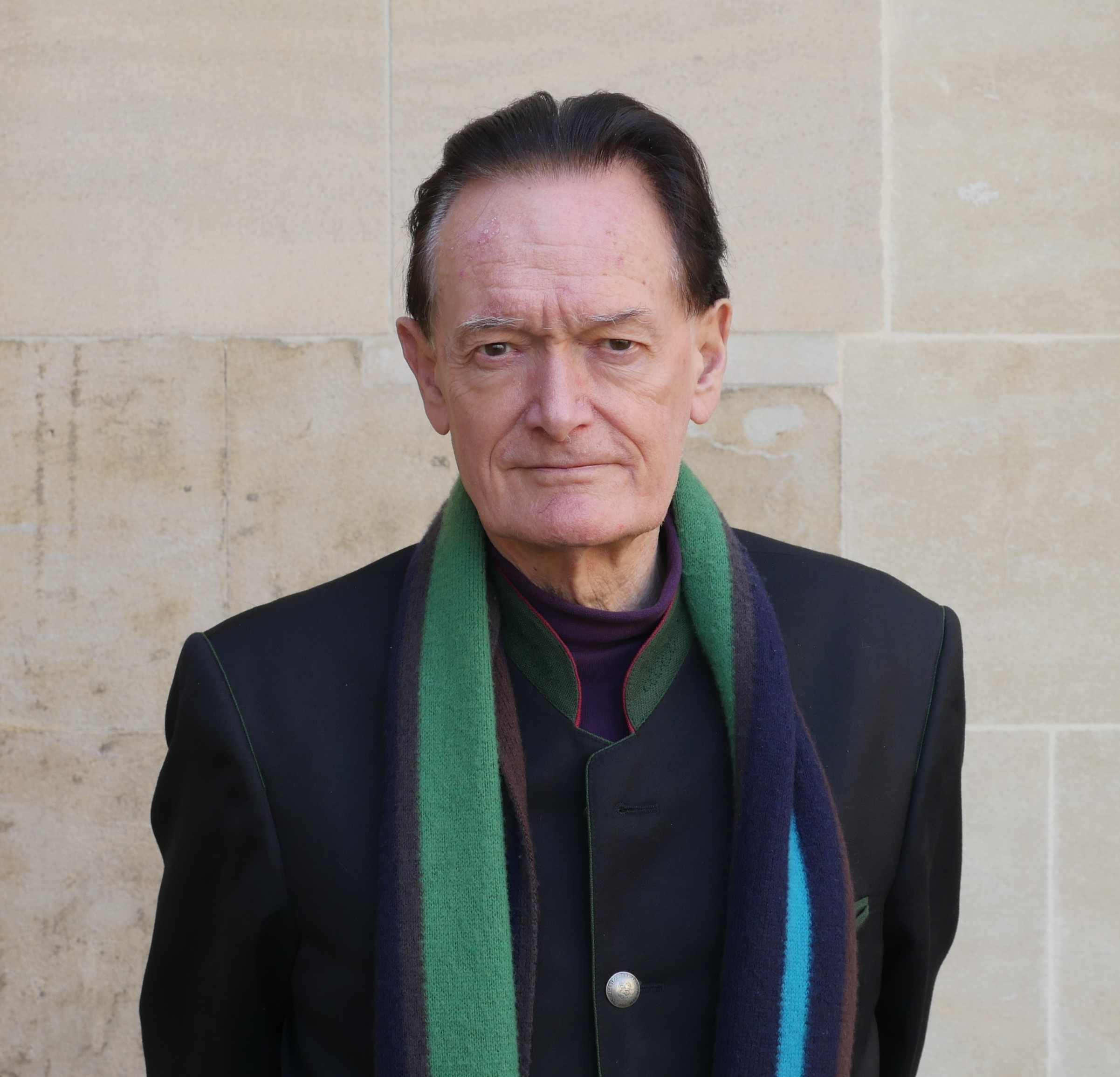
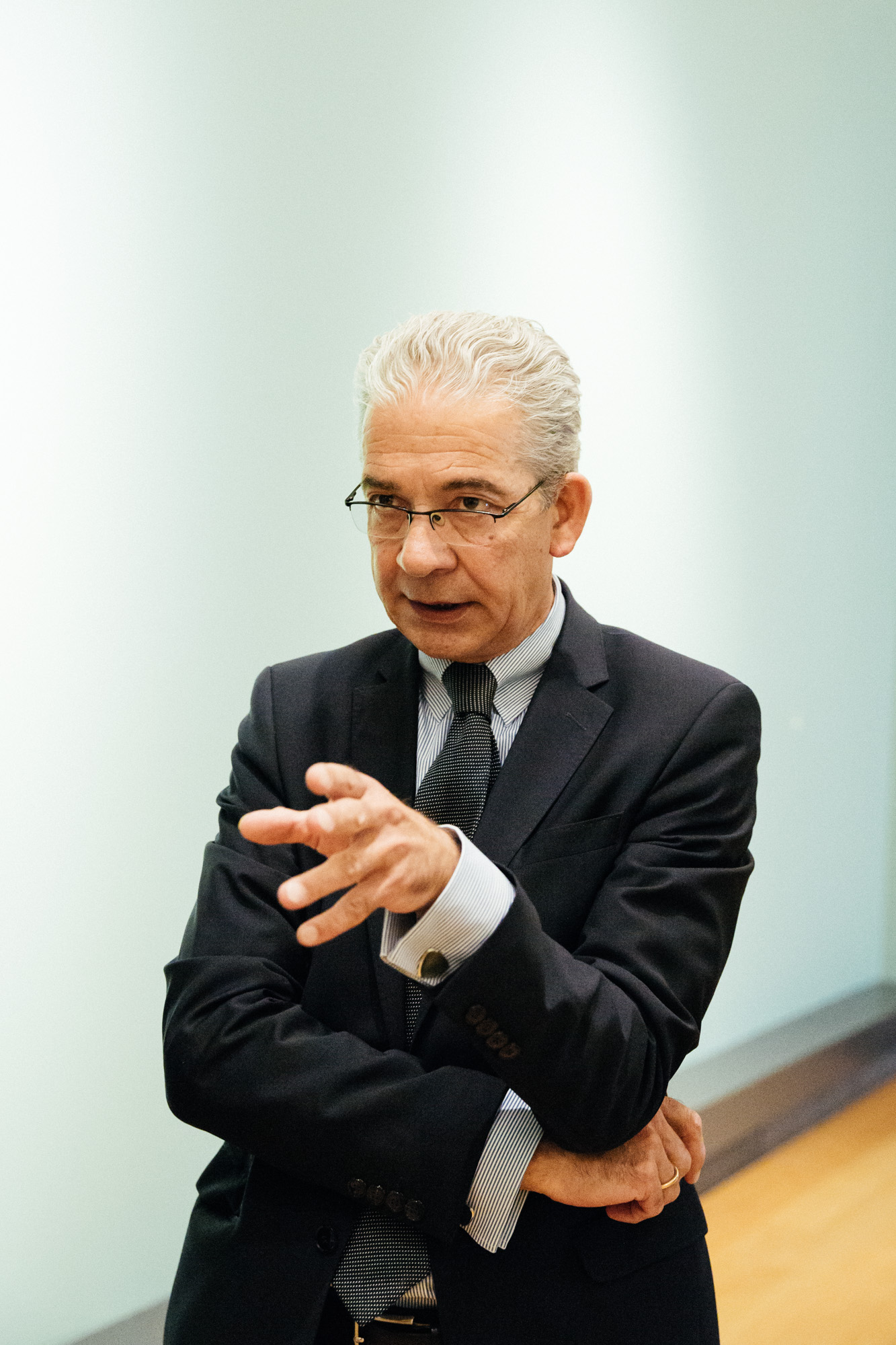
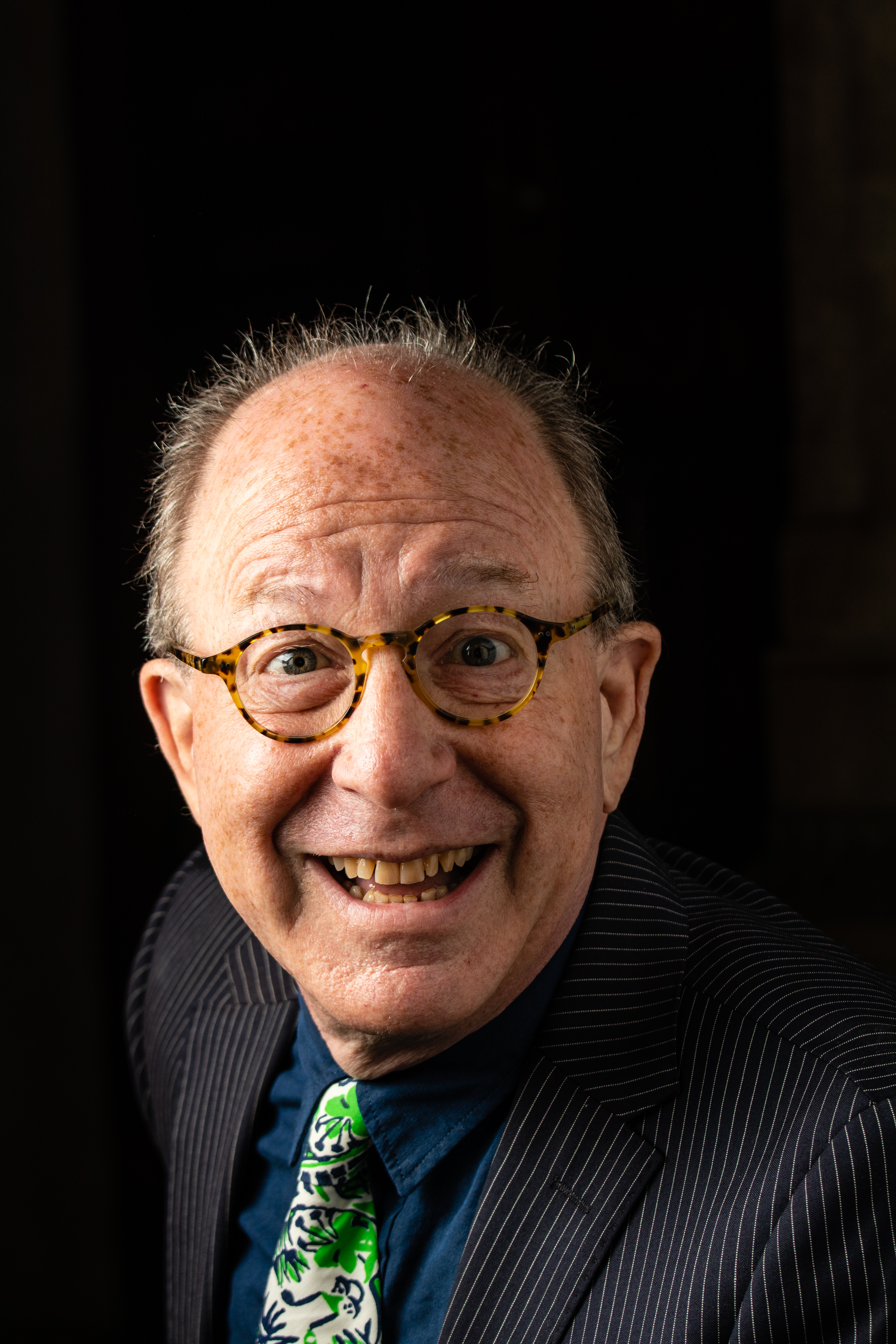
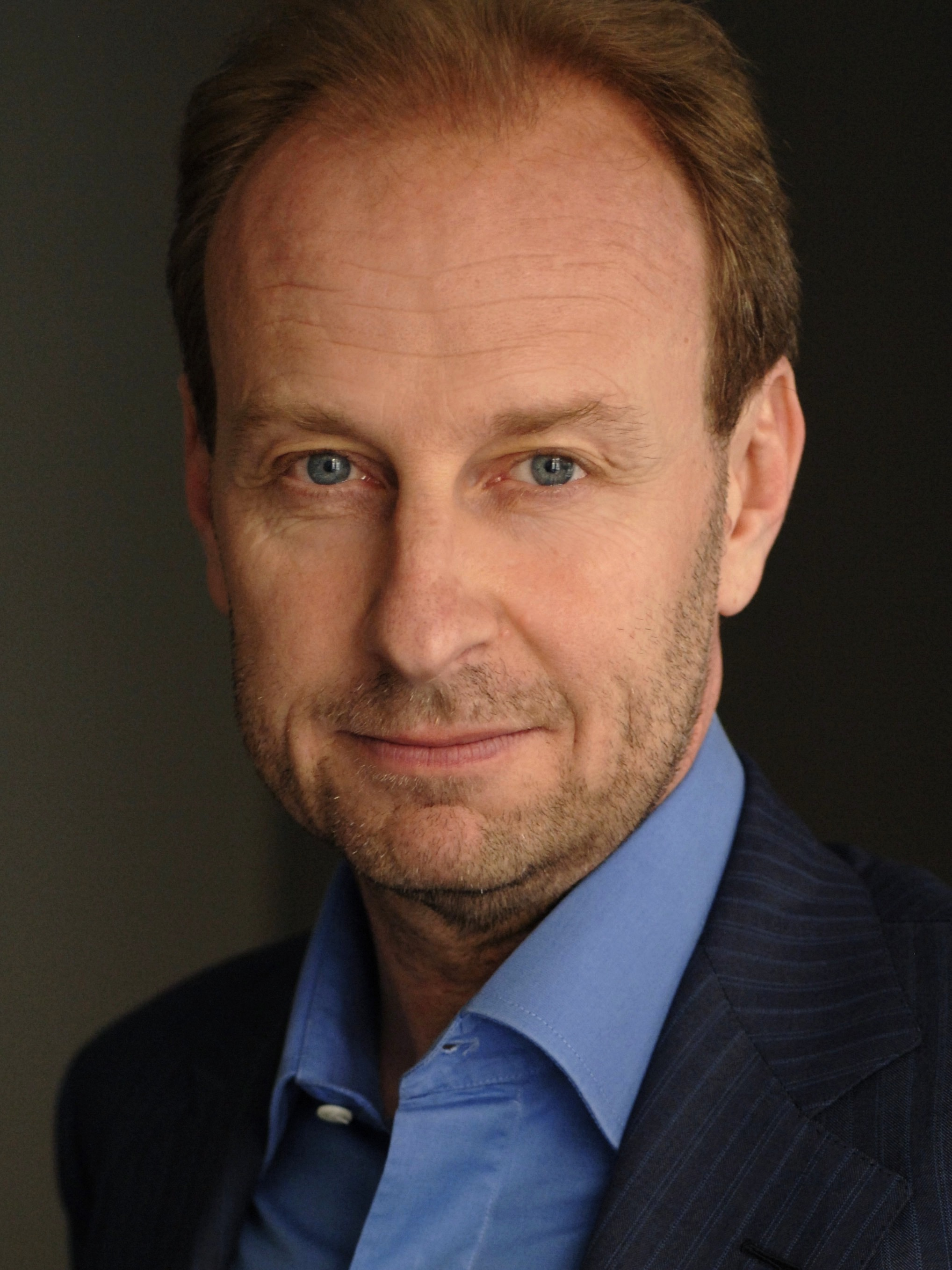
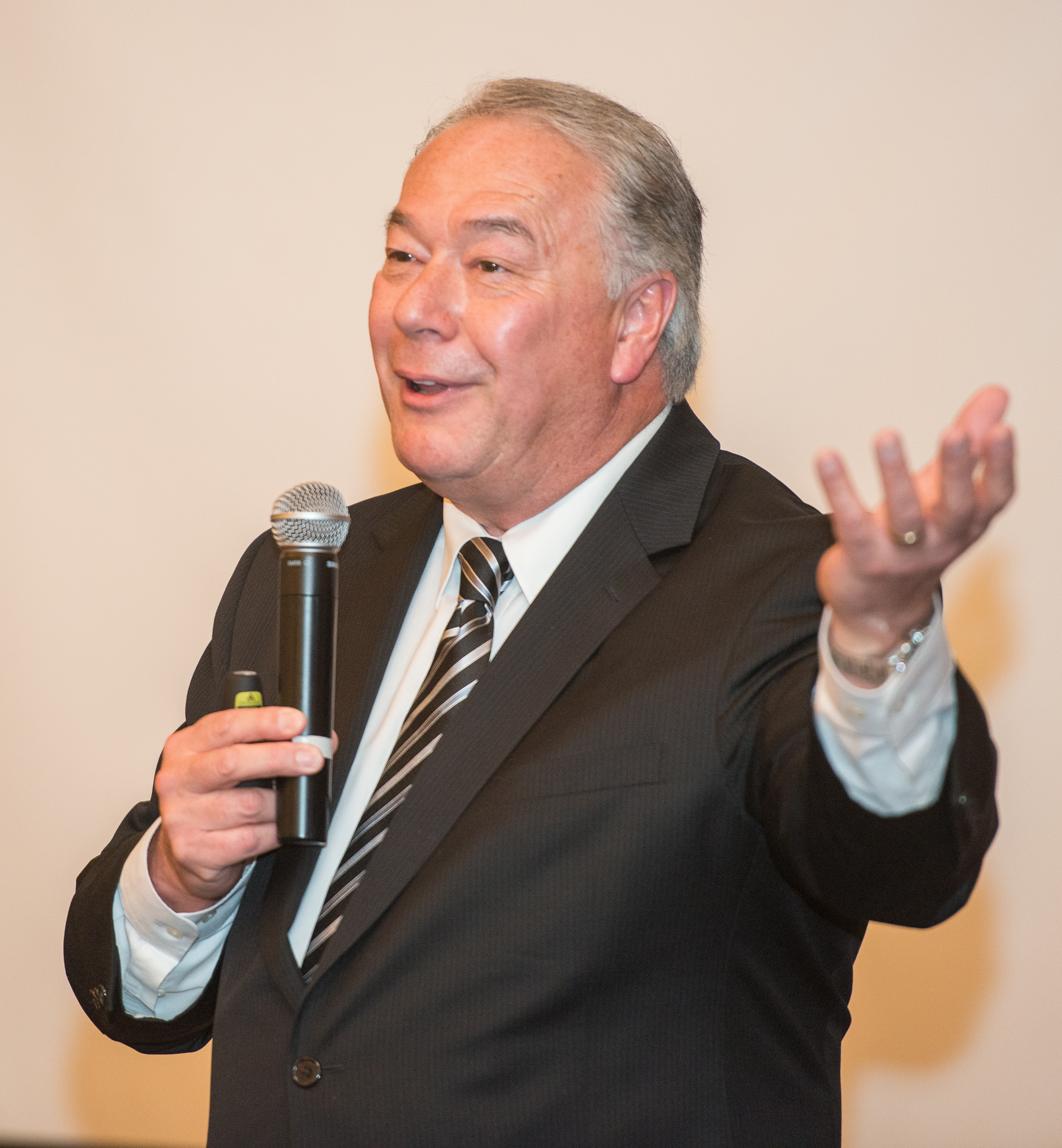
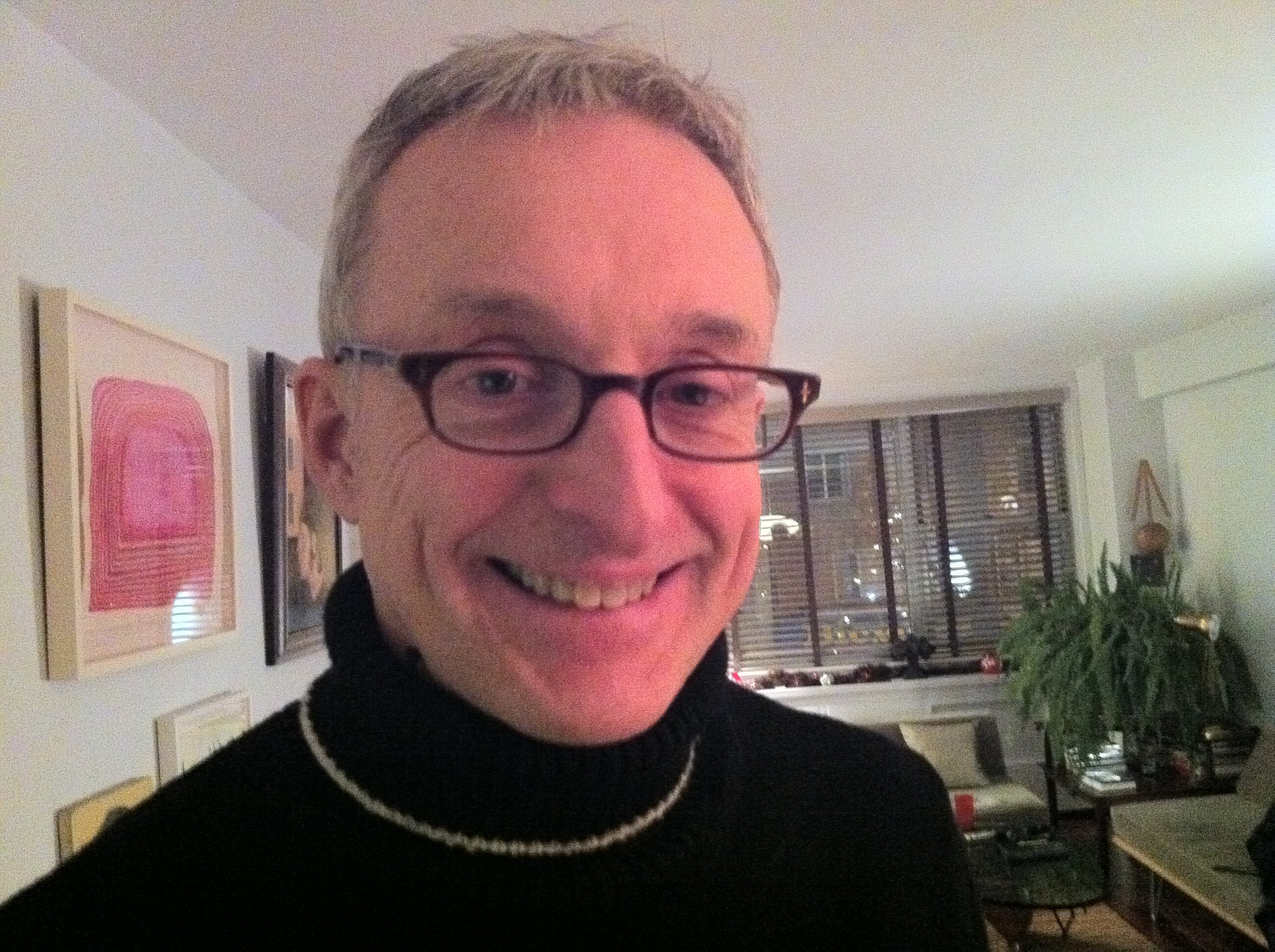
People interviewed by the film (top l-to-r): Martin Kemp, Bernd Lindemann, and Jerry Saltz; (bottom l-to-r), Yves Bouvier, Robert King Wittman, and David Kirkpatrick

People interviewed in the four different sections of the film are:

Discovery and restoration:

- Alexander Parish, American art dealer (and "sleeper hunter") who found the painting in 2005
- Robert Simon, American art historian and art dealer who bought the painting with Parish
- Dianne Dwyer Modestini, American art restorer who worked on the painting in 2005–17
- Warren Adelson, American art dealer engaged to value and sell the painting

Authentification and 2011 National Gallery exhibition:

- Martin Kemp, British art historian and academic
- Maria Teresa Fiorio, Italian art historian and academic
- Bernd Lindemann, German art curator at the Gemäldegalerie in Berlin
- Frank Zöllner, German art historian and academic
- Kenny Schachter, American art expert, art writer, and art collector
- Georgina Adam, British art expert, art writer, and art journalist
- Jerry Saltz, American Pulitzer prize-winning art critic and art journalist
- Luke Syson, Former British National Gallery curator who controversially labelled the work "by Leonardo" in 2011

2013 sale to Bouvier and then to Rybolovlev:

- Yves Bouvier, Swiss businessman and art dealer who purchased the painting in 2013, and sold it weeks later to Dmitry Rybolovlev
- Bruce Lamarche, a business associate of Bouvier and expert in the activities of Freeports
- Robert King Wittman, founder and former leader of the Federal Bureau of Investigation Art Crime Team (ACT)
- Doug Patteson, former CIA officer
- Evan Beard, head of Fine Art services at Bank of America
- Alexandra Bregman, art writer and art journalist who wrote a book on The Bouvier Affair

2017 sale by Rybolovlev to Mohammed bin Salman and postponed Louvre exhibition:

- Alison Cole, a British art historian and editor of The Art Newspaper who was the first to reveal a Louvre book authenticating the painting
- Antoine Harari, a French journalist who phone interviews the Louvre about their withdrawal of their book authenticating the painting
- Jacques Franck, a French fine art restorer and Leonardo specialist who wrote to Macron warning him against displaying the painting at the Louvre
- Didier Rykner, a French art historian and art journalist who published the book withdrawn by the Louvre
- Stéphane Lacroix, art academic and expert in Middle Eastern art and art buyers
- Bradley Hope, an American investigative journalist and author of books on bin Salman
- David Kirkpatrick, an American journalist who wrote a New York Times article stating that bin Salman bought the painting

== Production ==
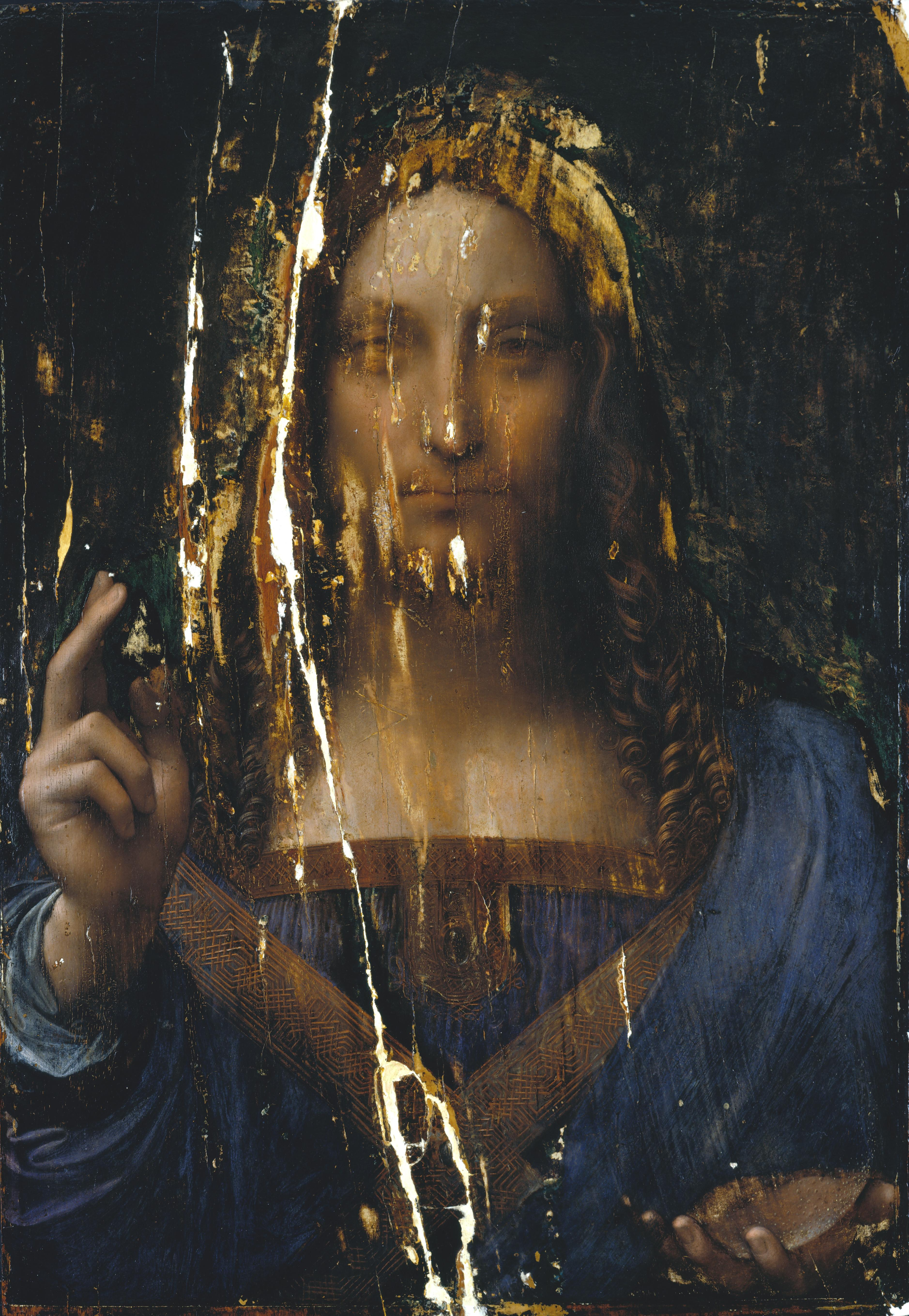
After cleaning (2006–07)

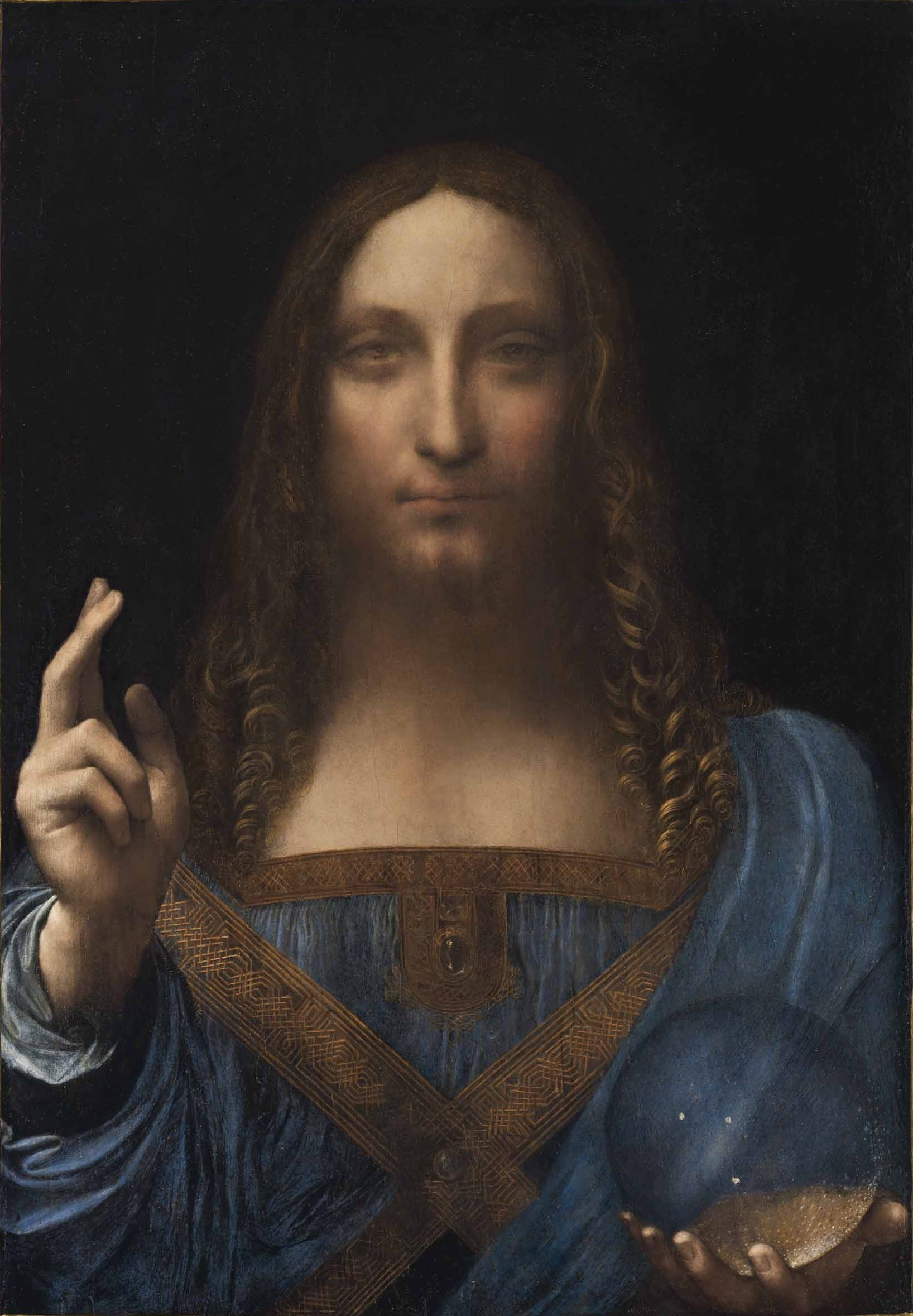
After restoration (2017)

In April 2019, the British art critic and filmmaker Ben Lewis published his well-received book, The Last Leonardo: The Secret Lives of the World’s Most Expensive Painting, giving a detailed account of the discovery and sale of the Salvator Mundi painting, and the issues and concerns around the provenance and authentification of the work. In October 2019, it was announced that Andreas Koefoed would direct a film about the painting, The Lost Leonardo, with Dogwoof set to distribute in the United Kingdom.

The producer Andreas Dalsgaard told BBC Culture that "When we chose the title, the inspiration was partly that the painting is lost right now and the truth is lost, but it was also inspired by movies like the Indiana Jones movies that are full of treasures and treasure hunts". Koefoed told The Guardian that the tone of the film was to be "The Emperor's New Clothes", "puffed up institutions and authorities declare they've discovered a Leonardo, only to be exposed and mocked".

== Release ==
In March 2021, Sony Pictures Classics acquired worldwide distribution rights (excluding the United Kingdom, France and Germany) to the film. It had its world premiere at the Tribeca Film Festival on June 13, 2021. It also screened at AFI Docs on June 26, 2021. It was released in the United States on August 13, 2021, and in the United Kingdom on September 10, 2021.

At the same time a second, French-made film, by Antoine Vitkine, was released titled The Saviour for Sale: The Story of Salvator Mundi. It covered much of the same material as The Lost Leonardo but did not include some central figures such as Dianne Modestini; Vitkine's film took a dimmer view of Modestini's motivations and actions. Saviour for Sale includes interviews with anonymous French government officials who had access to the Louvre's analysis of the painting. They reveal that the Louvre could only conclude that Leonardo "contributed to the painting", which was not acceptable to bin Salman who required full authentification.

== Reception ==
On the review aggregator website Rotten Tomatoes the film has an approval rating of 97% based on 78 reviews, with an average rating of 8.00/10. On Metacritic, the film has a weighted average score of 79 out of 100, based on 17 critics, indicating "generally favorable reviews".

Critics praised the film for its portrayal of the story as a thriller. Times's film critic Kevin Maher awarded the film 5/5 stars, calling it "a thrilling examination of art world". The Guardian' film critic Peter Bradshaw awarded the film 4/5 stars, saying that "The story of the hotly disputed discovery and sales of a purported new Leonardo da Vinci work doesn’t paint the art market in a flattering light". Variety film critic Owen Gleiberman called it "An Enthralling Art-World Mystery That Only Starts By Asking: Is It or Isn’t It?" The Financial Times' film critic Danny Leigh also gave the film 4/5 stars, saying that "So riveting is the documentary The Lost Leonardo, you can imagine namesake Leonardo DiCaprio starring in the dramatisation". The Washington Post's film critic Annabel Aguiar gave the film 3.5/4 stars calling it "... an art documentary that plays like a thriller". Glenn Kenny at the New York Times added the film to his "Critics Pick" list, saying that it "packs the fascination and wallop of an expertly executed fictional thriller".

== Awards ==
- 6th Critics' Choice Documentary Awards, Best Documentary Feature (Nominated)
- Stockholm International Film Festival, Bronze Horse Award (Nominated)

== See also ==
- Cultural references to Leonardo da Vinci
- Economics of the arts and literature
- List of works by Leonardo da Vinci
- List of most expensive paintings
- The Price of Everything, a 2018 American documentary film about contemporary art valuations
