= Ai Weiwei: The Fake Case =

- Film poster
- Directed by: Andreas Johnsen
- Produced by: Katrine Sahlstrøm
- Starring: Ai Weiwei
- Cinematography: Andreas Johnsen
- Edited by: Adam Nielsen
- Production companies: Rosforth Films; Danish Documentary; BBC
- Distributed by: International Film Circuit
- Release date: November 6, 2013 (CPH:DOX)
- Running time: 86 minutes
- Country: Denmark
- Languages: Mandarin; English

Ai Weiwei: The Fake Case is a 2013 documentary film about Chinese artist and activist Ai Weiwei, directed by Danish filmmaker Andreas Johnsen. The film won Best 2014 Documentary in Danish Film Critics Association's 67th Bodil Awards, played in the official selection of 2014 Hot Docs Canadian International Documentary Festival in Toronto and International Documentary Film Festival Amsterdam.

The documentary explores Ai Weiwei's battle against the fake tax case thrust on him by the Chinese government in effort of political suppression and the consequences that the 81-day detention had on his art, politics and personal life. It was pitched at the 2012 MeetMarket as part of the Sheffield Doc/Fest.

== Description ==
Ai Weiwei: The Fake Case opens with scenes of Ai Weiwei being released from his 81-day detention spent in solitary confinement, and he is subsequently put on house arrest following gigantic and inexplicable charges of tax evasion—the case the film's title references. At home, he has a sleeping disorder and memory loss, while 18 cameras monitor his studio and home, and police agents follow his every move. Heavy restrictions from the Kafkaesque Chinese authorities weigh him down. Ai Weiwei is visibly shaken, but during his year on probation, he steadily finds new ways to provoke and challenge the mighty authoritarian regime in his fight for human rights and free expression.

The film picks up where Alison Klayman's Ai Weiwei: Never Sorry left off, but Ai Weiwei The Fake Case is more explicitly political. The documentary also features creation of S.A.C.R.E.D., an artwork featuring sculpture dioramas of Ai's time in prison, which premiered during the 2013 Venice Biennale.

== Critical reception ==
On review aggregator Rotten Tomatoes, the film holds an approval rating of 93% based on 27 reviews, with an average rating of 7.14/10. On Metacritic, the film has a weighted average score of 73 out of 100, based on 13 critics, indicating "generally favorable reviews".
