= Alexander Parish =

American art dealer

Alexander Parish is a New York art dealer and the joint former owner of the Salvator Mundi by Leonardo da Vinci; he appears in the 2021 film, The Lost Leonardo.
