= Portrait of a Musician =

Unfinished painting by Leonardo da Vinci

- Ritratto di musico (Italian)
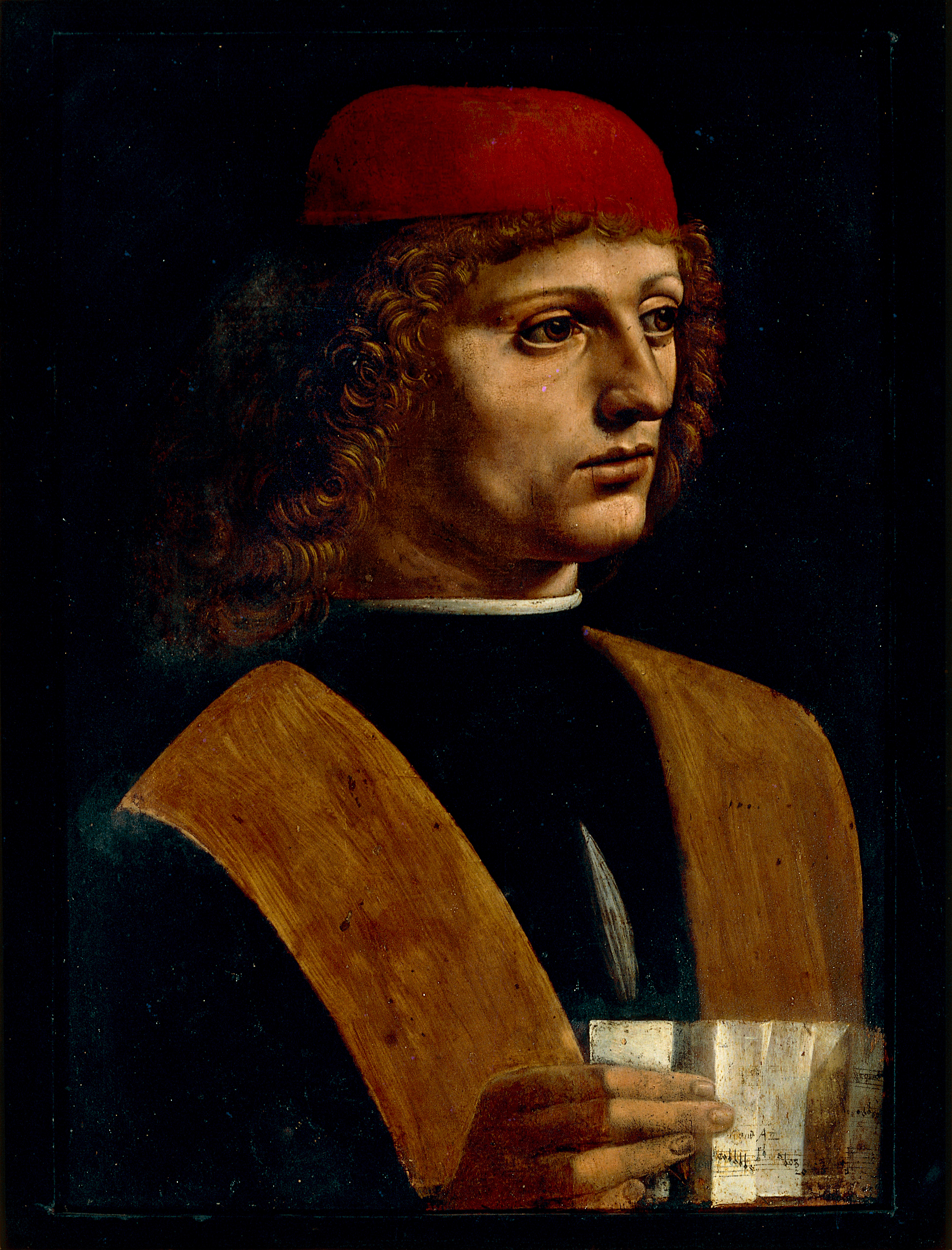
- Artist: Leonardo da Vinci
- Year: c. 1483–1487 (unfinished)
- Medium: Oil (and possibly tempera) on walnut panel
- Subject: Identity uncertain
- Dimensions: 44.7 cm × 32 cm (17.6 in × 13 in)
- Location: Pinacoteca Ambrosiana, Milan

The Portrait of a Musician (Note: The work is most commonly known as the Portrait of a Musician (Italian: Ritratto di musico). It is sometimes known as the Portrait of a Young Man, the Portrait of a Man with a Sheet of Music or the Musician.) is an unfinished painting by the Italian Renaissance artist Leonardo da Vinci, dated to c. 1483–1487. Produced while Leonardo was in Milan, the work is painted in oils, and perhaps tempera, on a small panel of walnut wood. It is his only known male portrait painting, and the identity of its sitter has been closely debated among scholars.

Perhaps influenced by Antonello da Messina's introduction of the Early Netherlandish style of portrait painting to Italy, the work marks a dramatic shift from the profile portraiture that predominated in 15th-century Milan. It shares many similarities with other paintings Leonardo executed there, such as the Louvre Virgin of the Rocks and the Lady with an Ermine, but the Portrait of a Musician is his only panel painting remaining in the city, where it has been in the Pinacoteca Ambrosiana since at least 1672. One of Leonardo's best preserved paintings, there are no extant contemporary records of the commission. Based on stylistic resemblances to other works by Leonardo, virtually all current scholarship attributes at least the sitter's face to him. Uncertainty over the rest of the painting arises from the stiff and rigid qualities of the body, which are uncharacteristic of Leonardo's work. While this may be explained by the painting's unfinished state, some scholars believe that Leonardo was assisted by one of his students.

The portrait's intimacy indicates a private commission, or one by a personal friend. Until the 20th century it was thought to show Ludovico Sforza, a Duke of Milan and employer of Leonardo. During a 1904–1905 restoration, the removal of overpainting revealed a hand holding sheet music, indicating that the sitter was a musician. Many musicians active in 15th-century Milan have been proposed as the sitter; Franchinus Gaffurius was the most favored candidate throughout the 20th century, but in the 21st century scholarly opinion shifted towards Atalante Migliorotti. Other notable suggestions include Josquin des Prez and Gaspar van Weerbeke, but there is no historical evidence to substantiate any of these claims with certainty. The work has been criticized for its stoic and wooden qualities, but noted for its intensity and the high level of detail in the subject's face. Scholarly interpretations range from the painting depicting a musician mid-performance, to representing Leonardo's self-proclaimed ideology of the superiority of painting over other art forms, such as music.

== Description ==
=== Composition ===
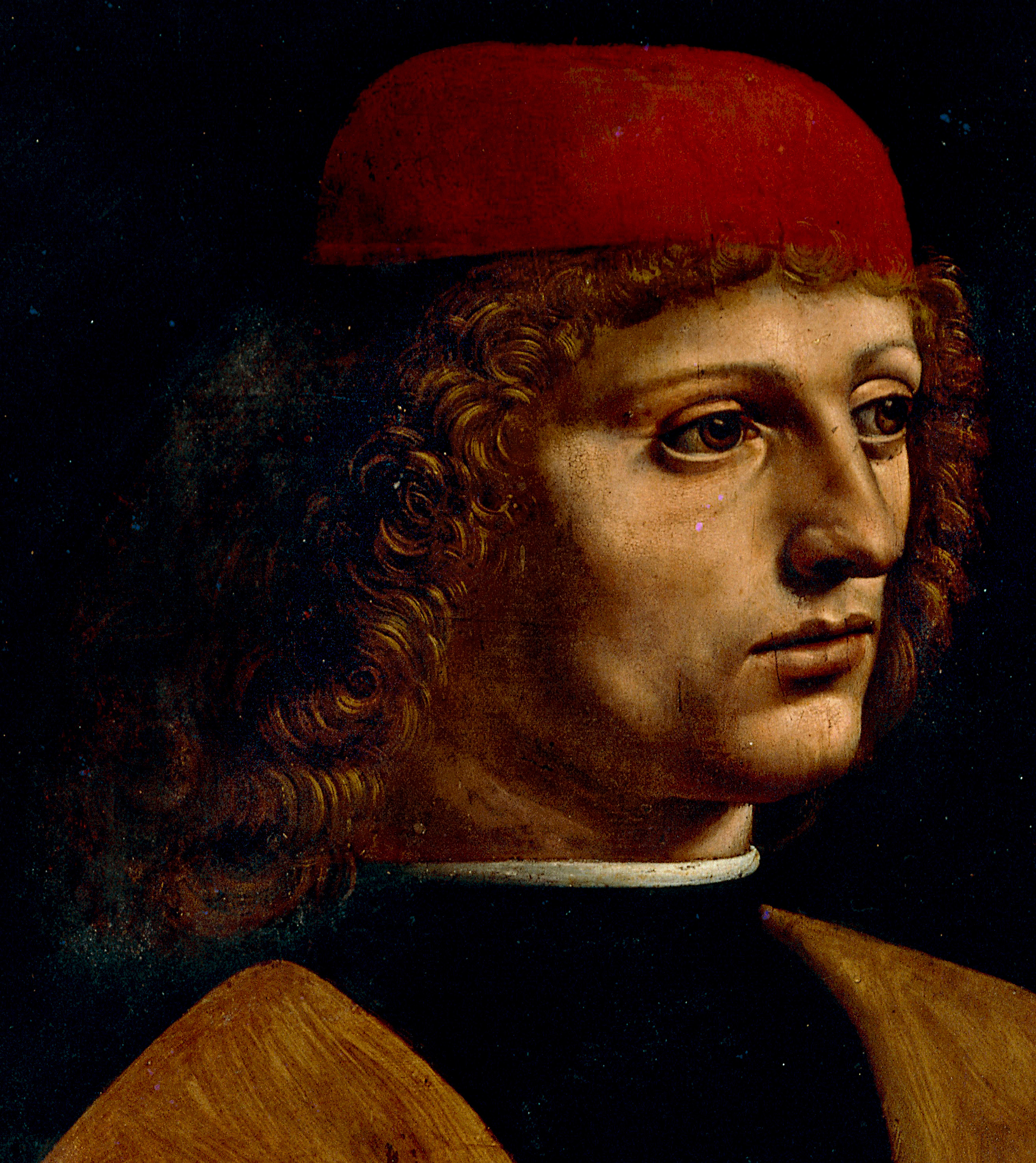
Detail of the face

This painting was executed in oils and perhaps tempera (Note: Sources vary on the materials used to create the Portrait of a Musician. The Pinacoteca Ambrosiana (Archived 2 October 2020 at the Wayback Machine) and Zöllner (2019, p. 225) list the work as "tempera and oil", while Marani (2003, p. 339), Syson et al. (2011, p. 95) and Fiorio (2014, p. 153) list only oils, as do older sources such as Ottino della Chiesa (1967, p. 100) and Wasserman (1975, p. 138). None of these sources note any disagreement between scholars on the painting's materials.) on a small, 44.7 cm × 32 cm (17.6 in × 12.6 in) walnut wood panel. It depicts a young man in bust length and three-quarter view, whose right hand holds a folded piece of sheet music. The painting is largely unfinished save for the face and hair, but is in good condition overall, with only the bottom right corner suffering damage. The art historian Kenneth Clark noted that out of Leonardo's surviving works, the Musician is perhaps the best preserved, despite the fading of colors over time.

The bottom of the work may have been slightly trimmed. There is a small amount of retouching, especially towards the back of the head; the art historian Frank Zöllner has noted that this retouching introduced the somewhat unsuccessful shading of the neck and the left side of the lips. With its black background, the portrait is reminiscent of Leonardo's later portraits, the Lady with an Ermine and La Belle Ferronnière, but differs from them in that the sitter's body and head face the same direction. The biographer Walter Isaacson has noted that due to the work's unfinished state, the portrait's shadows are overtly harsh, and the portrait itself features fewer of the thin layers of oil paint typically found in Leonardo's paintings.

=== The musician ===
The sitter has curly shoulder-length hair, wears a red cap, and stares intently at something outside the viewer's field of vision. His stare is intensified by careful lighting that focuses attention on his face, especially on his large glassy eyes. He wears a tight white undershirt. The painting of his black doublet is unfinished and his brownish-orange stole is only underpainted. The colors are faded, probably due to minor repainting and poor conservation. Technical examination of the work has revealed that the doublet was probably originally dark red, and the stole bright yellow.

The mouth hints at a smile, or suggests that the man is about to sing or has just sung. A notable feature of his face is the effect on his eyes from the light outside the frame. The light dilates the pupils of both eyes, but the proper right far more than the left, something that is not possible. Some have argued that this is simply for dramatic effect, so that the viewer feels a sense of motion from the musician's left to right side of his face. The art historian Luke Syson has written that "the eyes are perhaps the most striking feature of the Musician, sight given primacy as the noblest sense and the most important tool of the painter".

=== Sheet music ===
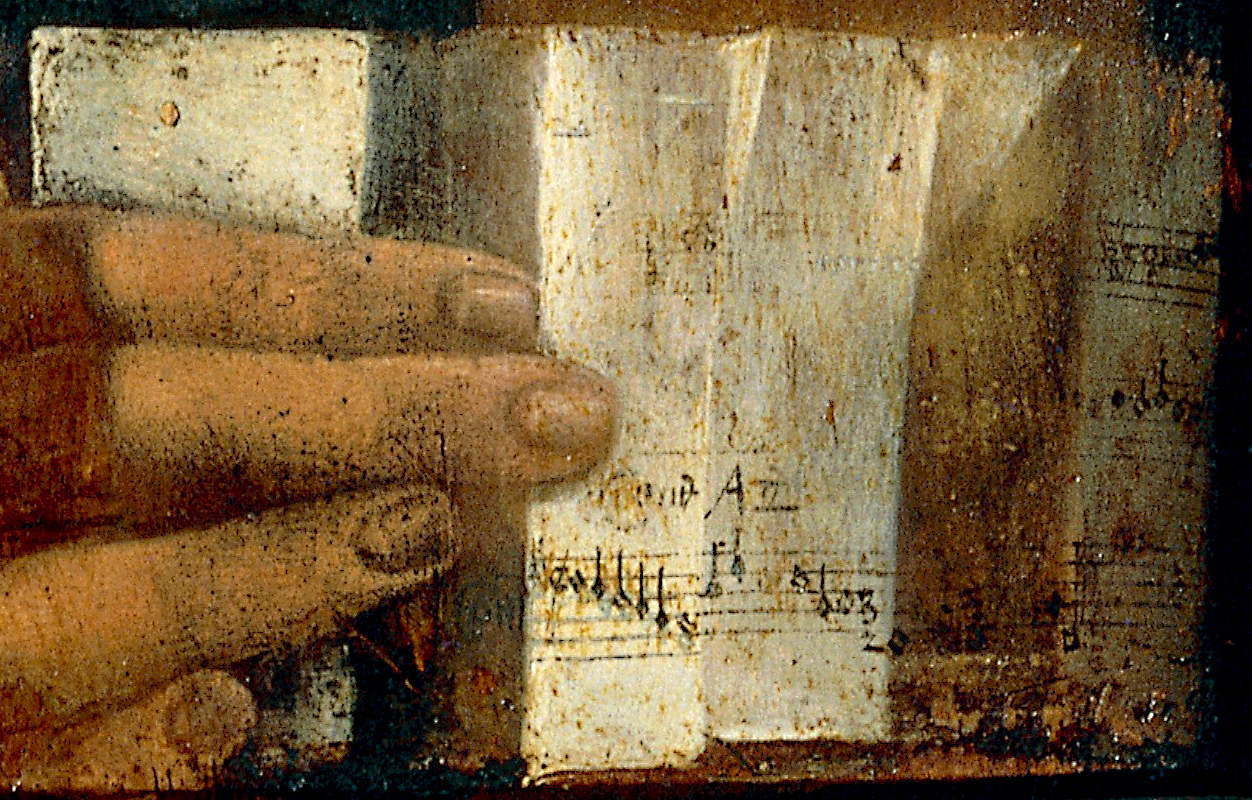
Detail of the sheet music

The stiffly folded piece of paper, which is held in an odd and delicate manner, is a piece of sheet music with musical notes and letters written on it. Due to the poor condition of the lower part of the painting, the notes and letters are largely illegible. This has not stopped some scholars from hypothesizing what the letters say, often using their interpretations to support their theory of the musician's identity. The partially erased letters can be made out as "Cant" and "An" and are usually read as "Cantum Angelicum", Latin for 'angelic song', although the art historian Martin Kemp notes that it could be "Cantore Angelico", Italian for 'angelic singer'. The notes have offered little clarity into the painting, other than strongly suggesting that the subject is a musician. They are in mensural notation and therefore probably show polyphonic music. Leonardo's surviving drawings of rebuses with musical notation in the Print Room of Windsor Castle do not resemble the music in the painting. This suggests that this musical composition is not by Leonardo, which leaves the composer and the significance of the music unknown.

== Attribution ==
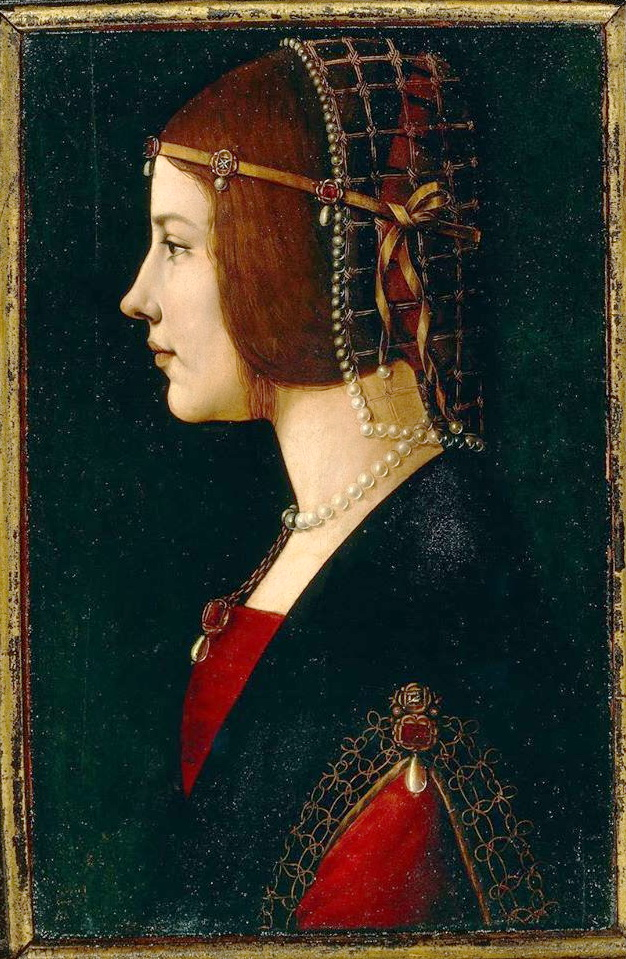
The Portrait of a Lady (c. 1490) by Giovanni Ambrogio de Predis was formerly thought to be by Leonardo and was paired with the Portrait of a Musician.

Although the attribution to Leonardo had been controversial in earlier centuries, modern art historians now regard the Portrait of a Musician as one of his original works. Doubts about ascribing the work to Leonardo have existed for almost as long as the painting has been known. Its first appearance in a 1672 catalog for the Pinacoteca Ambrosiana listed it as by Leonardo, but a 1686 inventory of the collection attributed it to Bernardino Luini. This was quickly crossed out and changed to "or rather by Leonardo". In 1798, the Ambrosiana attributed the portrait to the "school of Luini", but it was soon relisted as by Leonardo. When first listed in 1672, it was described as having "all the elegance that might be expected of a ducal commission", (Note: Alternatively translated as: "the face of the Duke of Milan, with such elegance, that perhaps the living Duke would have wanted it for himself".) which implies that the subject was thought to be Ludovico Sforza, Duke of Milan, who was Leonardo's employer when the painting was executed. This was accepted until the 20th century, when scholars believed it to be a pendant to the Portrait of a Lady in the Ambrosiana, now attributed to Giovanni Ambrogio de Predis but at the time thought to be a portrait by Leonardo of Beatrice d'Este, Ludovico's wife. In the mid-20th century, the Leonardo specialist Angela Ottino della Chiesa identified eleven scholars who supported an attribution to Leonardo; eight who ascribed the work to Ambrogio de Predis; two who were undecided and one who considered it the work of Giovanni Antonio Boltraffio, another of Leonardo's students. (Note: Scholarly attributions in the mid-20th century: Beltrami, Cook, Ricci, Schiaparelli, Bode, Liphart, Suida, Berenson, Goldscheider, Clark and Heydenreich attributed the work to Leonardo; Morelli, Seidlitz, Frizzoni, Carotti, A. Venturi, Mallaguzzi Valeri, Poggi, Hildebrandt to Ambrogio de Predis; Bottari to Boltraffio; Cagnola and Castelfranco were undecided.)

There is no extant record of the portrait's commission. Its attribution to Leonardo is based on stylistic and technical similarities to other works by him, notably the face of the angel in the Louvre Virgin of the Rocks and that of the titular figure in Saint Jerome in the Wilderness. (Note: Clark noted that a study for the Virgin of the Rocks in Turin bears an even closer resemblance to the Musician.) The dark background of the portrait, a style popularized by Leonardo, furthers this attribution as it appears in later paintings by him, such as the Lady with an Ermine, La Belle Ferronnière and Saint John the Baptist. The Lady with an Ermine in particular has shown many stylistic similarities to the Musician from X-ray testing. Other characteristics typical of Leonardo's style include the melancholic atmosphere, the sensitive eyes, the ambiguous mouth (which seems to have just closed or is about to open), and curly hair reminiscent of his earlier portrait, Ginevra de' Benci. Also characteristic of Leonardo is the use of walnut wood, a medium he favored and recommended, but which was not commonly used by other artists in Lombardy at the time. The attribution is further supported by a comparison of the pupils of the musician's eyes, which dilate to different degrees; a connection has been noted to the following passage in Leonardo's notebooks:

The pupil dilates and contracts according to the brightness or darkness of the objects [in its sight]; and since it takes some time to dilate and contract, it cannot see immediately on going out of the light and into the shade, nor, in the same way, out of the shade and into the light, and this very thing has already deceived me in the painting of an eye, and that is how I learned it.

Challenge to the painting's attribution stems from its rigid and stoic demeanor, which is uncharacteristic of Leonardo's usual paintings. While some scholars consider this a result of the painting's unfinished state, others have proposed that the clothing and torso were painted by a student. If Leonardo was assisted by another artist, the most frequently cited candidates are Boltraffio and Ambrogio de Predis, due to their style being closer to the hard and rigid qualities of the portrait. According to the art historian Carlo Pedretti, Boltraffio and Marco d'Oggiono, another student of Leonardo, depict eyes in the same way as the portrait, suggesting that either might have collaborated with Leonardo on the work. The art historian Pietro C. Marani noted that it is unlikely that Leonardo would have had assistants in the mid-1480s, and even if so, they would not likely have assisted on a portrait for an official or a personal friend. (Note: Marani specified that there is no evidence that Boltraffio was in Leonardo's studio before 1490.) Despite Marani's claims, the modern scholarly consensus on whether Leonardo was assisted remains unclear: Zöllner stated that it is "now accepted that Leonardo executed the face, while Boltraffio is credited with the entire upper body", whereas according to Syson only a "substantial minority" of scholars disagreed with a full attribution. While there is debate on the authorship of the painting as a whole, most scholars are agreed that the face, at least, is entirely Leonardo's work.

== Dating ==
Art historians place the work within Leonardo's first Milanese period (c. 1482–1499), due to similarities with other works from this time, including stylistic resemblances to the Lady with an Ermine found via X-ray testing, as well as the treatment of chiaroscuro in the Louvre Virgin of the Rocks, and his sketches for a bronze horse sculpture. Older sources dated the work to the middle of this period, with dates of 1485–1490 and 1490 given.

Modern scholars, including Syson and Marani, have observed that Leonardo could not have executed the portrait much later than 1487, as it is considered to lack the refinement and realism of later works informed by his anatomical studies, such as the Lady with an Ermine. It was not until 1489 that Leonardo engaged in a study of human anatomy, particularly that of the skull. Because of this, the painting is now thought to have been completed earlier in the period, during the mid-1480s, usually between 1483 and 1487. (Note: Scholars date the painting to 1483–1487: Kemp (2019, p. 47): c. 1483–1486; Marani (2003, p. 339): c. 1485; Syson et al. (2011, p. 95): c. 1486–1487; Zöllner (2019, p. 225): c. 1485) (Note: The earliest scholars date the work is 1483, even though Leonardo's first Milanese period began c. 1482. This may be explained by the uncertainty surrounding Leonardo's arrival in Milan; while he is believed to have moved there some time in 1482, he is first firmly documented there in April 1483.)

== Background ==
=== Historical context ===
The Portrait of a Musician is a radical departure from the prevailing form of portraiture in 15th-century Milan. The Milanese audience was more artistically conservative than others elsewhere in Italy, and would have expected most, if not all, portraits to be in profile, like those by Zanetto Bugatto, Vincenzo Foppa and Ambrogio Bergognone. The sitter's three-quarter profile was already common in Early Netherlandish painting, where portraits were often set against a flat black background. Antonello da Messina would introduce similar three-quarter-view portraits with black backgrounds in Venice and Sicily, with works like the Portrait of a Man (Il Condottiere) and the Portrait of a Man with a Red Hat. Leonardo is likely to have been influenced by Antonello's style, and could have seen that artist's work during Antonello's brief visit to Milan in 1476, or in Venice around 1486, when Leonardo might have been in the city visiting his former teacher Andrea del Verrocchio. The art historian Daniel Arasse suggested that while the Portrait of a Musician is the most similar of Leonardo's portraits to Antonello's, the figure is facing away from the viewer, in contrast not only to most of Antonello's portraits, but also to Leonardo's other portraits. The Portrait of a Young Man (c. 1490–1491) in the Pinacoteca di Brera by an artist in Leonardo's circle (Note: The Brera Portrait of a Young Man is attributed variously to Ambrogio de Predis (Marani 2003, p. 163), Boltraffio (Syson et al. 2011, p. 100) and the Master of the Archinto Portrait (Fiorio 2014, pp. 155–161).) was heavily influenced by the Portrait of a Musician.

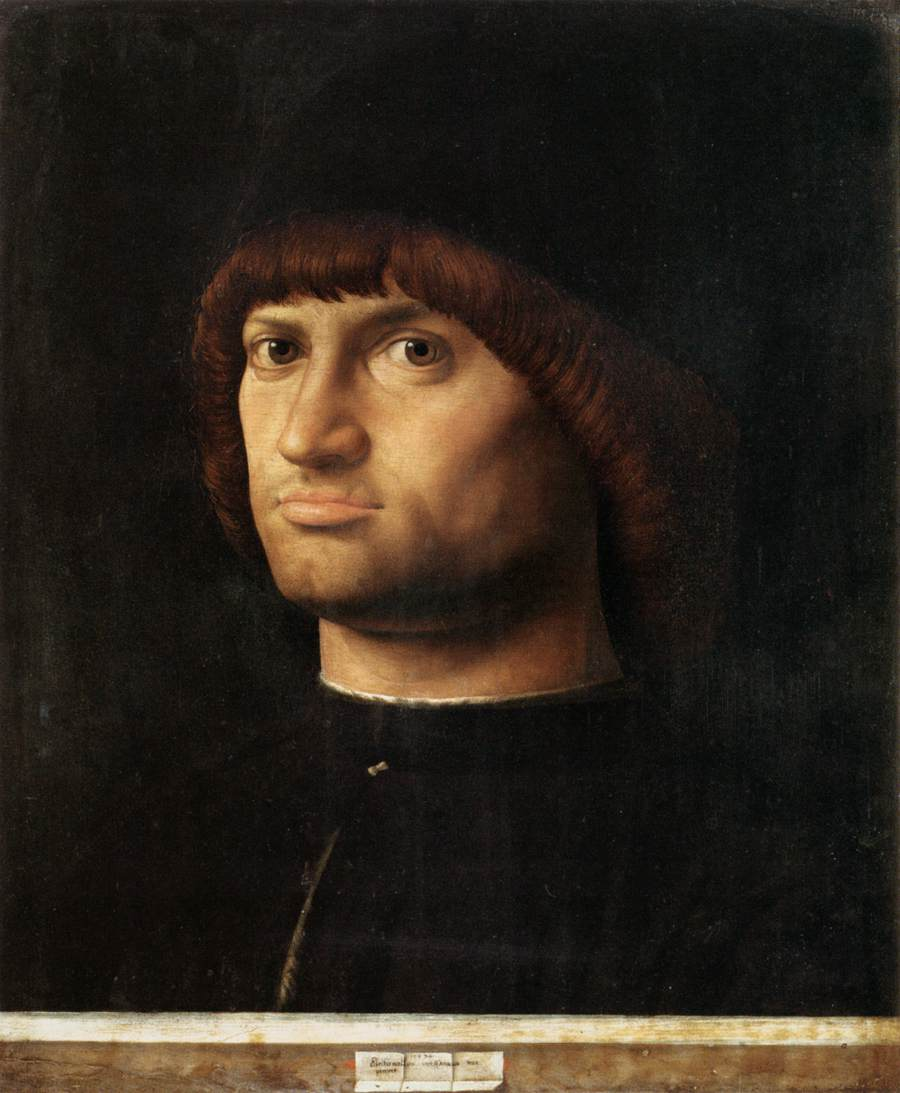
Il Condottiere, c. 1475, Antonello. Louvre, Paris. Antonello's method of lighting the face may have inspired Leonardo.

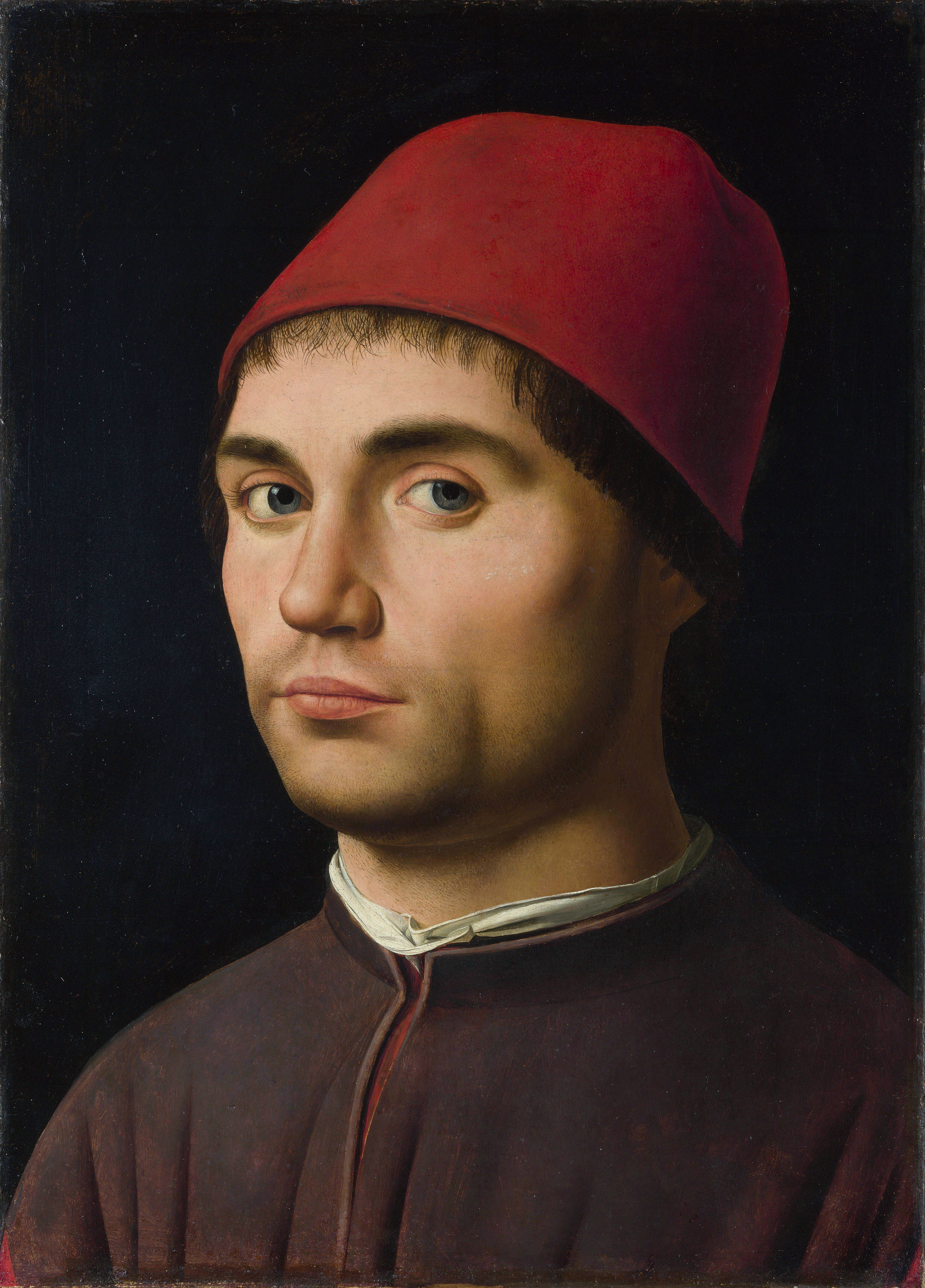
Portrait of a Man with a Red Hat, c. 1475–1476, Antonello. National Gallery, London. Like Antonello, Leonardo emphasizes the subject's face, which dominates the frame.

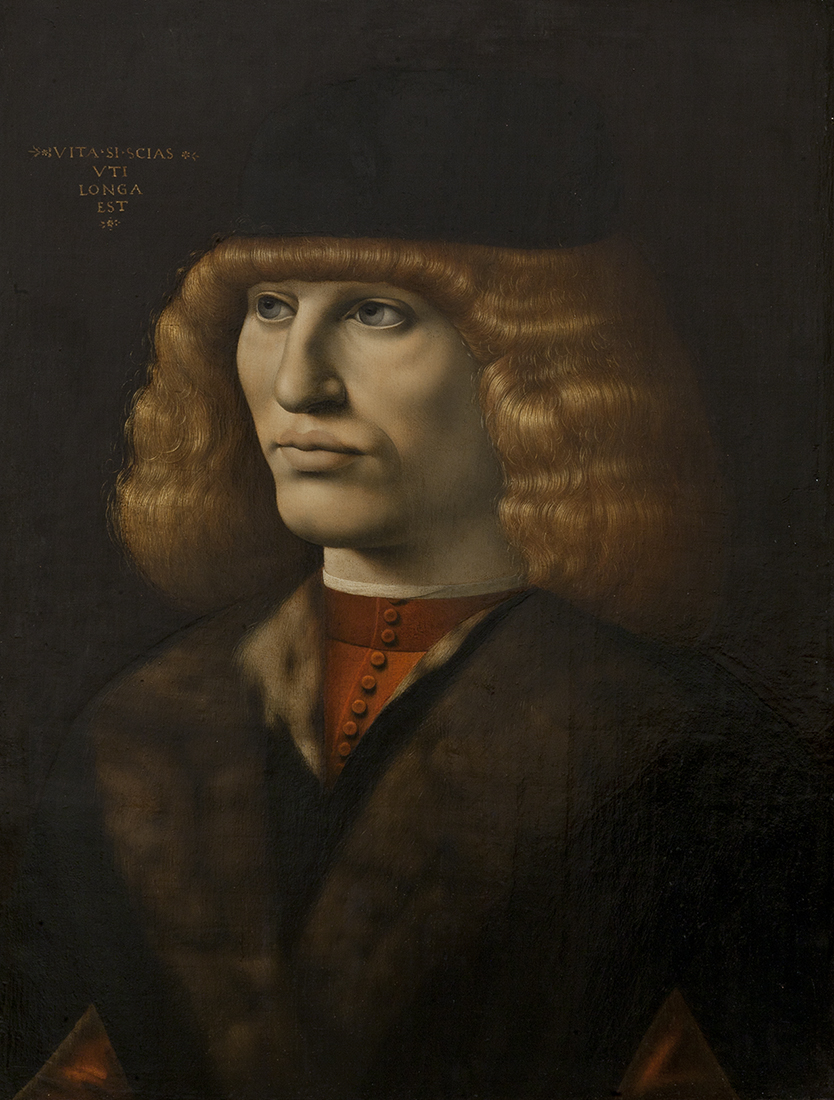
Portrait of a Young Man, c. 1490–1491, Circle of Leonardo. Pinacoteca di Brera, Milan. The artist was noticeably inspired by the Portrait of a Musician.

=== Provenance ===
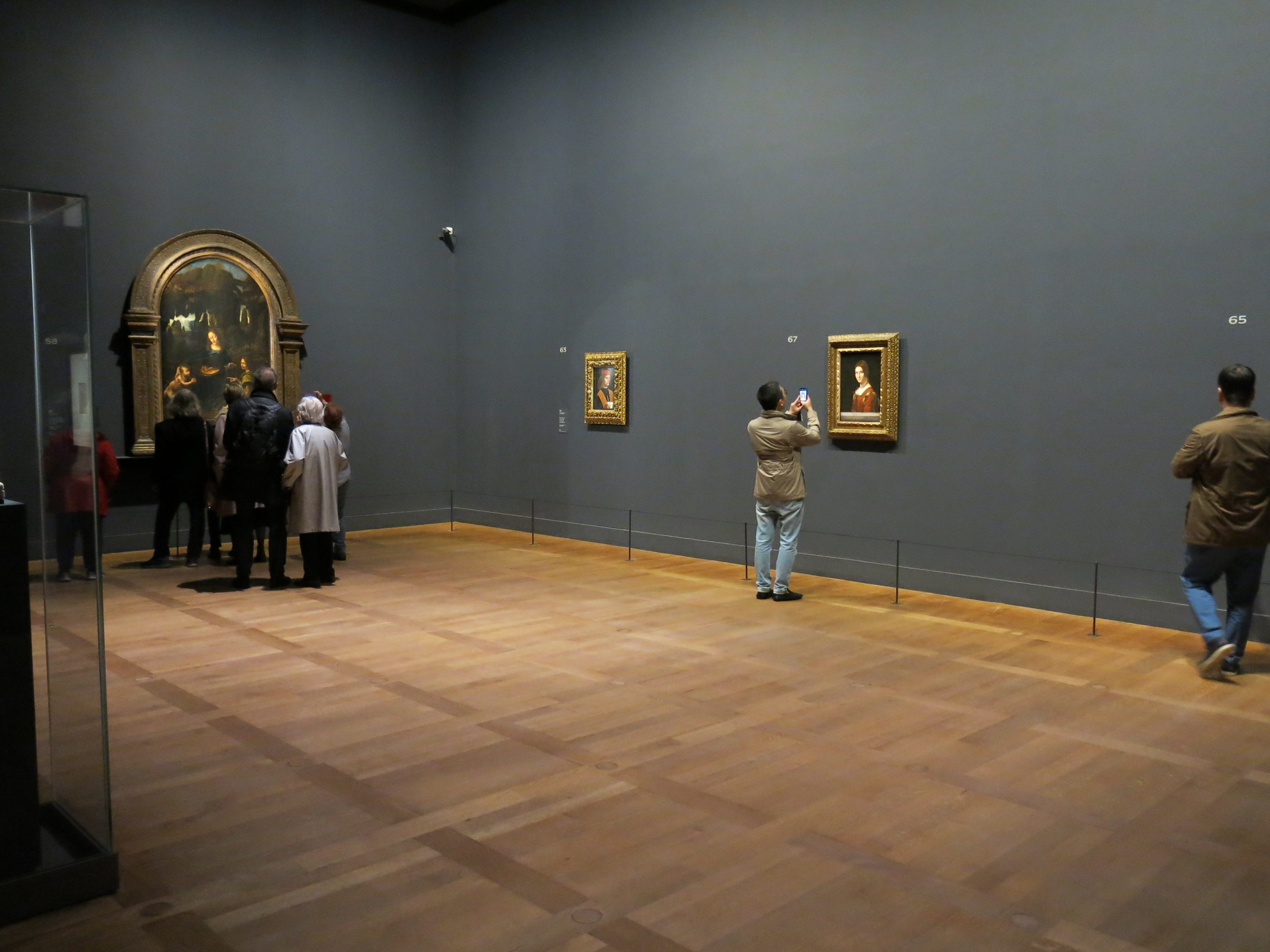
(From left to right) The Louvre Virgin of the Rocks, Portrait of a Musician and La Belle Ferronnière at the Louvre's monumental 2019–2020 exhibition: Léonard de Vinci

The Portrait of a Musician is Leonardo's only known male portrait painting and his only panel painting to remain in Milan. Marani noted that the work was likely meant for private use. It is generally thought not to have been among the works gifted to the Ambrosiana by its founder, Cardinal Federico Borromeo, in 1618, which at the time made up the bulk of the museum's collection. It is possible that it may have been given to the Ambrosiana in 1637 by Galeazzo Arconati, a noted collector of works by Leonardo such as The Virgin and Child with Saint Anne and Saint John the Baptist and the Codex Atlanticus.

The work is first documented in 1672 when it was catalogued by Pietro Paolo Bosca in the Ambrosiana. Sources vary on whether Napoleon took the Portrait of a Musician to France in 1796. Marani stated that it was looted, but Syson stated that the French considered the Codex Atlanticus to be more valuable and took that instead. Both scholars agree that it was in the Ambrosiana in 1798.

The portrait was exhibited in the 2011–2012 exhibition Leonardo da Vinci: Painter at the Court of Milan at the National Gallery, London, the 2015 exhibition Leonardo 1452–1519: Il Disegno del Mondo at the Royal Palace of Milan, and the 2019–2020 exhibition Léonard de Vinci at the Louvre.

== Identity of the sitter ==
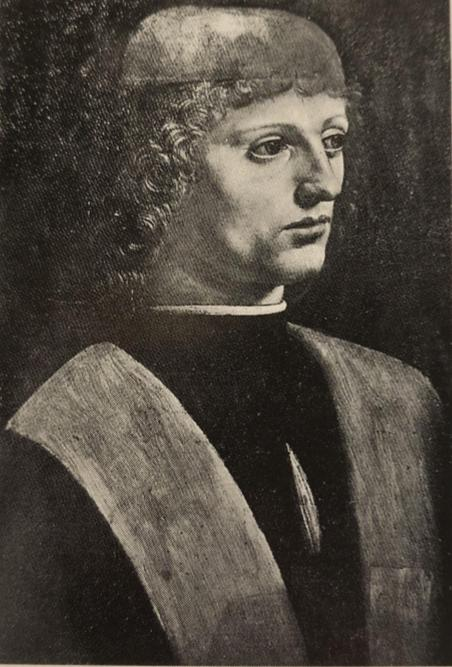
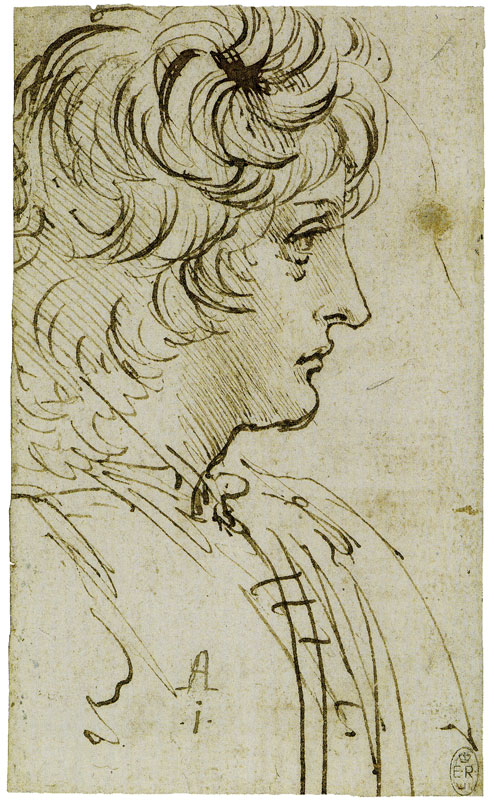
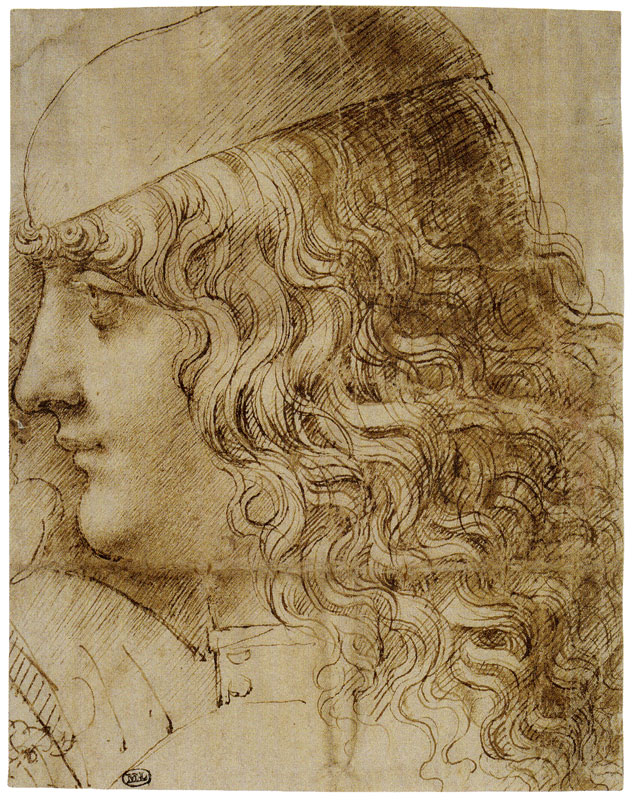
(Left) The Portrait of a Musician before its 1904–1905 restoration; two drawings (middle by Leonardo, right by Napoletano), thought to depict the sitter for the Portrait of a Musician(Top left) The Portrait of a Musician before its 1904–1905 restoration; two drawings (top right by Leonardo, bottom by Napoletano), thought to depict the sitter for the Portrait of a Musician

The identification of the sitter as Ludovico was accepted until a 1904–1905 restoration by Luigi Cavenaghi and Antonio Grandi removed a layer of overpaint and revealed a hand holding sheet music. This led scholars to believe that the subject was not Ludovico, but a musician in Milan at the same time as Leonardo. Since this discovery, numerous candidates have been proposed as the sitter; however, his identity remains uncertain. The man may have appeared in other works by Leonardo and his studio. Scholars at the National Gallery have suggested that Francesco Napoletano's Portrait of a Youth in Profile and Leonardo's drawing of a Bust of a Youth in Profile are of the same person. Various historical candidates have been proposed, but without firm evidence.

=== Franchinus Gaffurius ===
The architectural historian Luca Beltrami's proposition of Franchinus Gaffurius (1451–1522) became the leading candidate in the early 20th century. Gaffurius was a priest and a prominent music theorist in Milan, court musician for Ludovico Sforza, and maestro di cappella of Milan Cathedral. He is sure to have been acquainted with Leonardo, since—in addition to their shared employer—Gaffurius's 1496 music treatise, Practica Musicae, contains various woodcuts by Leonardo. Additionally, Beltrami proposed that the letters "Cant" and "Ang" were abbreviated from the Latin "Cantum Angelicum" and a reference to Angelicum ac divinum opus, another music treatise by Gaffurius.

Doubt has been cast upon this theory since the iconographic evidence does not match Gaffurius to the sitter. Kemp has noted that the letters "Cant" and "Ang" could just as easily stand for "Cantore Angelico", Italian for 'angelic singer'. The subject of the painting was not depicted in a clerical robe, which would have properly identified him as a priest, and the subject of the painting is a young man, whereas Gaffurius would have been in his early thirties at the time of the painting's creation.

=== Atalante Migliorotti ===
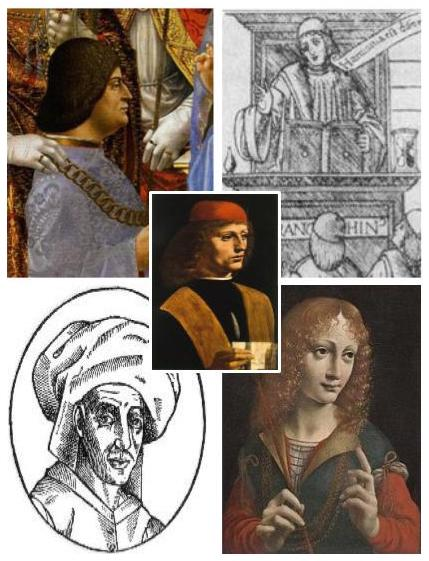
Clockwise from top left: Ludovico Sforza, Gaffurius, Gian Galeazzo Sforza and Josquin have each been proposed as the subject of the Portrait of a Musician (center) (clickable image—use cursor to identify).

Marani's 1999 treatise suggests the Tuscan musician Atalante Migliorotti (1466–1532), and since then many commentators have supported the theory. In 1482, Migliorotti and Leonardo left Florence for the court of Ludovico Sforza in Milan. They were known to be friends and Leonardo is believed to have taught Migliorotti the lute. During the painting's conception, Migliorotti would have been in his late teens or early twenties, making him a plausible candidate. Additionally, in a 1482 inventory from the Codex Atlanticus, (Note: Folio 888 recto (ex 324 recto).) Leonardo listed "a portrait of Atalante with his face raised". (Note: Alternatively translated as: "a portrait of Atalante with his upturned face" or "a head portrayed from Atalante who raises his face".) This is thought to have been a study for, or an earlier version of, the Portrait of a Musician. The intimate nature of the present portrait makes it especially likely that the subject was a personal friend.

The main argument against this theory is that the subject's face is not raised as described in the 1482 note. However, Marani noted that while the musician's face is not raised in a literal sense, "the expression seems uplifted, suggesting a singer who has just raised his face from the sheet of music". Since the widespread rejection of Franchinus Gaffurius as the leading candidate, Migliorotti is now favored by many commentators.

=== Josquin des Prez ===
In 1972 the Belgian musicologist Suzanne Clercx-Lejeune proposed the French singer and composer Josquin des Prez (c. 1450–55 – 1521) as the sitter. Josquin worked in the service of the Sforza family during the 1480s, concurrently with Leonardo. Clercx-Lejeune proposed that the words on the sheet music are "Cont" (an abbreviation of "Contratenor"), "Cantuz" (Cantus), and "A Z" (an abbreviation of "Altuz"), and that this meant that they were associated with a song with a descending melodic line, such as masses, motets and songs by Josquin. (Note: An example is Josquin's motet Illibata Dei Virgo nutrix.) This theory has since been discredited; the notation is largely illegible and many composers were writing in this manner. As with Gaffurius, other portraits of Josquin do not show a resemblance to the sitter and, as a priest in his mid-thirties, he was unlikely to have been the painting's subject.

=== Gaspar van Weerbeke ===
The art historian Laure Fagnart suggested in 2019 that the sitter is Gaspar van Weerbeke (c. 1445–1516), a Netherlandish composer and singer. Weerbeke worked for the Sforza family at the same time as Leonardo, and so they likely knew each other. This theory cites letters from Galeazzo Maria Sforza to Gotardo Panigarola concerning the attire of musicians for the court, with one stating, "Gotardo. To Weerbeke, our singer, we would like to give a dark velvet robe, such as you have given to the Abbot [Antonio Guinati] and to Cordier, both of them also our singers". As Fagnart pointed out, the letter is too vaguely stated to definitely link Weerbeke to the portrait. Additionally, Weerbeke presents the same issue as Josquin and Gaffurius; Weerbeke would have been in his thirties and probably too old to be the sitter.

=== Others ===
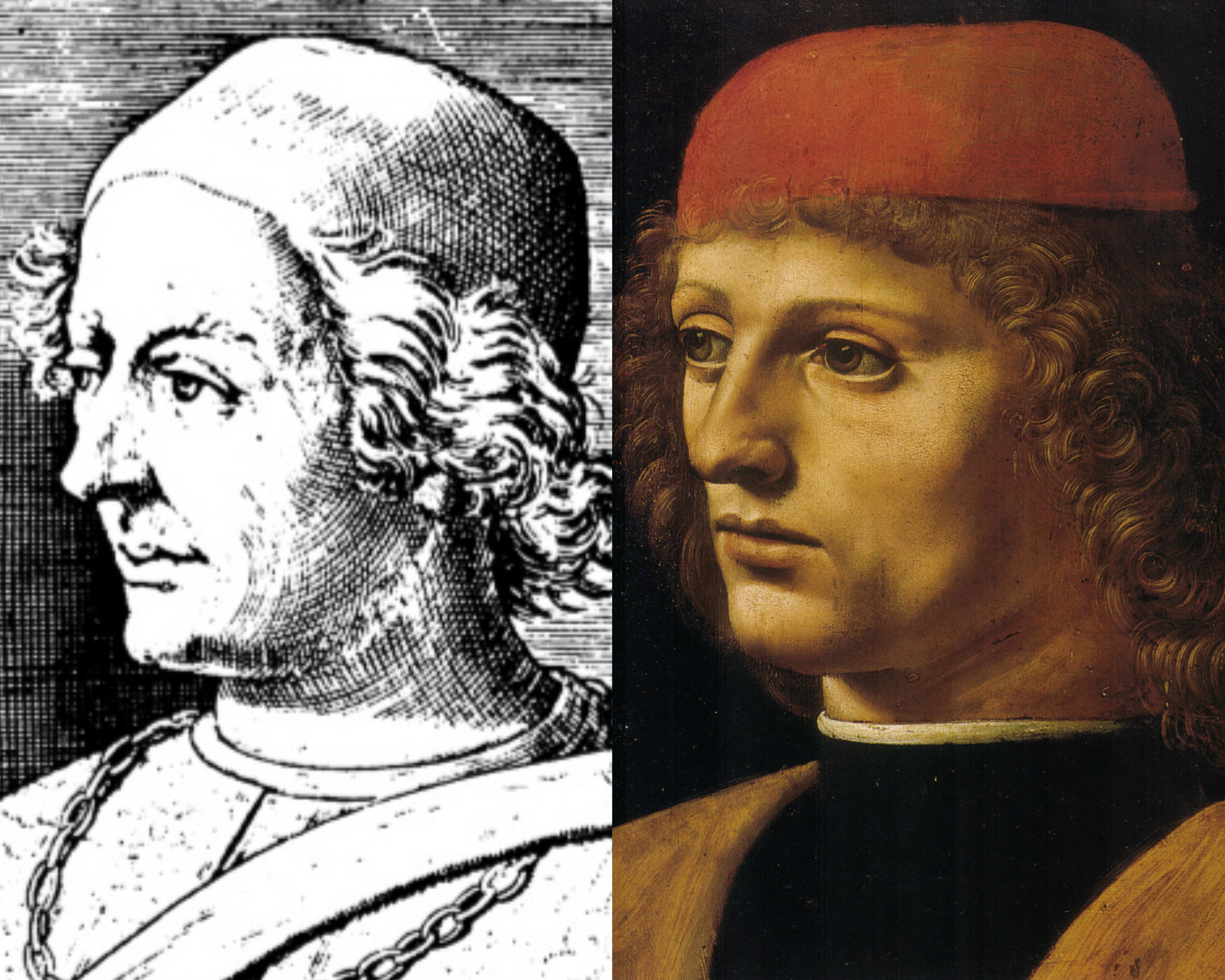
Comparison between the portrait of Roberto Sanseverino and the Portrait of a Musician.

At the end of the 19th century, the subject of the portrait was identified by Paul Müller-Walde as Galeazzo Sanseverino, Ludovico's son-in-law and captain general of the Sforza militias, a prominent figure of the Milanese court. In support of this thesis, the Italian scholar Piero Misciatelli recalls that Galeazzo had been a patron of Leonardo and was probably passionate about music. Other scholars, such as the French art historian Robert de la Sizeranne, have recognized the traits of his father, Roberto Sanseverino.

Gian Galeazzo Sforza (1469–1494) has been proposed, given that the original, vague, description of the portrait stated that it depicted the Duke of Milan. Syson has noted that this identification would be particularly meaningful, as Gian Galeazzo was the rightful heir to the throne before Ludovico took power. However, there is no direct evidence to support this, and the uncovering of the sheet music makes this very unlikely as Gian Galeazzo is not known to have been a musician.

Francesco Canova da Milano (1497–1543), an Italian lutenist and composer, and the Flemish singer Giovanni Cordier have been proposed, albeit without substantive evidence. The Dutch illustrator Siegfried Woldhek has suggested that the Portrait of a Musician is one of three self-portraits by Leonardo, alongside the Vitruvian Man and a possible self-portrait known as the Portrait of a Man in Red Chalk.

== Critical opinion ==
The critical opinion of the Portrait of a Musician has historically been mixed, and negative reactions have given some scholars reluctance to grant it a full attribution to Leonardo. The 19th-century art historian Eugène Müntz complemented its "vigor of modeling worthy of Rembrandt", but criticized the work for a sullen expression, poor coloring and incompleteness. According to Marani, these comments can largely be explained by Müntz's use of a very poor reproduction for analysis. Like Müntz, Zöllner found fault with the work's incompleteness and expression; he also considered its pose inferior to that of Ginevra de' Benci. The art historian Jack Wasserman has stated that the portrait lacks the typical facial intensity of Leonardo's other works; however, Syson and Kemp have praised the sitter's intense stare, and the art historian Alessandro Vezzosi stated that in this work "Leonardo attains an unprecedented level of psychological intensity, which reaches the sublime in Lady with an Ermine". The chiaroscuro has been a point of contention: Zöllner and other scholars have criticized it as "over-emphatic"; Syson considered it dramatic and compelling; whereas Isaacson has criticized the shadowing but praised the lighting of the eyes. Syson has suggested that the work's unfinished state largely accounts for these negative reactions.

== Interpretation ==
Due to a paucity of contemporary records, some scholars have proposed theories as to the purpose of the painting. Some believe that the tension in the subject's face is intense because he has just finished or is in the process of performing. Other scholars see the painting as a representation of Leonardo's self-proclaimed ideology of the superiority of painting over other art forms such as poetry, sculpture and music. Leonardo declared at the beginning of his incomplete Treatise on Painting:

How Music Ought to be Called the Sister and Junior to Painting. Music is to be regarded none other than the sister of painting since it is subject to hearing, a sense second to the eye, and since it composes harmony from the conjunction of its proportional parts operating at the same time. [These parts] are constrained to arise and to die in one or more harmonic tempos which surround a proportionality by its members; such a harmony is composed not differently from the circumferential lines which generate human beauty by its [respective] members. Yet painting excels and rules over music, because it does not immediately die after its creation the way unfortunately music does. To the contrary, painting stays in existence, and will show you as being alive what is, in fact, on a single surface.

— Leonardo da Vinci, A Treatise on Painting (1490–1492)

These words seemingly disapprove of music's ephemeral nature, in contrast to painting's material and permanent physical qualities. This theory suggests that the sadness in the young man's eyes is due to the idea that music simply disappears after a performance. Another interpretation is that Leonardo was moved to depict the man's beauty. More likely, given the odd and seemingly intimate aesthetic of the painting, is that it was made as a personal gift for a close friend.
