= Erin Headley =

British musician

Erin Headley is an American lirone player, teacher, and director of several early music groups. She teaches at the University of Southampton in England.

With lutenist Stephen Stubbs and Andrew Lawrence-King she was part of the ensemble Tragicomedia, then founded the ensemble Tirami Su. She has also performed regularly with flautist Nancy Hadden's ensemble Circa 1500. In 2007 she founded the ensemble Atalante, named after Atalante Migliorotti, a musician and lutenist who was commissioned by Isabella d'Este to make the first lirone in 1505.

== Selected discography ==
with Les Arts Florissants

- 1982 : Luigi Rossi oratorios Il pecator pentito. O Cecità del misero mortale (lirone). William Christie
- 1983 : Monteverdi Il ballo delle ingrate and La Sestina (lira)
- 1987 : Monteverdi Selva morale e spirituale (lira)
- 1989 : Rossi Oratorio per la Settimana Santa
- 1991 : Rossi opera Orfeo (lirone)

with other ensembles

- Biber: Mystery Sonatas. John Holloway, Davitt Moroney, Tragicomedia. Virgin Classics, 1989. (lirone, viola da gamba).
- Rossi: Le canterine romane Tragicomedia. Teldec.
- Rossi: Vanitas Vanitatum - Roma 1650 Tragicomedia. Teldec.
- Che Soave Armonia works by Monteverdi, Legrenzi. Erin Headley, Ensemble Tirami Su, 1999.
- Awake, O North Wind German baroque. Dietrich Buxtehude, Samuel Scheidt, Schmelzer, Heinrich Schütz, Melchior Franck, Franz Tunder, Samuel Capricornus, Matthias Weckmann, Johann Rudolf Ahle. Singers: Laurie Reviol, Anna Eriksson, Suzanne Persson, Nora Roll, Harry van der Kamp. Ensemble Tirami Su. dir. Erin Headley, Challenge Classics.
- Reliquie di Roma I : Lamentarium. - Marco Marazzoli Lament of Helen of Troy. Lament of Artemisia. Luigi Rossi Lament of Mary Magdelene. Lament of the Blessed Virgin, Marc'Antonio Pasqualini. Domenico Mazzochi. Nadine Balbeisi, soprano; Theodora Baka, mezzo-soprano. Erin Headley, Atalante. Destino Classics / Nimbus Alliance NI 6152 July 2011.
- Reliquie di Roma II : Caro Sposo - Marco Marazzoli. Oratorio di Santa Catarina. Pasquini. excerpt Lamento di Cain from oratorio Cain e Abel. Nimbus Alliance NI 6185 June 2012. Katherine Watson, Nadine Balbeisi, Emily Van Evera, Steve Dugardin, Juan Sancho. Erin Headley, Atalante. Destino Classics.
