= Proton =

Subatomic particle with positive charge

- The valence quark content of a proton. The color assignment of individual quarks is arbitrary, but all three colors must be present. Forces between quarks are mediated by gluons.
- Classification: Baryon
- Composition: 2 up quarks (u), 1 down quark (d)
- Statistics: Fermionic
- Family: Hadron
- Interactions: Gravity, electromagnetic, weak, strong
- Symbol: p, p^{+}, N^{+}, ^{1}_{1}H^{+}
- Antiparticle: Antiproton
- Theorized: William Prout (1815)
- Discovered: Observed as H^{+} by Eugen Goldstein (1886). Identified in other nuclei (and named) by Ernest Rutherford (1917–1920).
- Mass: 1.67262192595(52)×10^{−27} kg 1.0072764665789(83) Da; 938.27208943(29) MeV/c^{2}
- Mean lifetime: > 0.96×10^{30} years (stable)
- Electric charge: +1 e
- Charge radius: 0.84075(64) fm
- Electric dipole moment: < 2.1×10^{−25} e⋅cm
- Electric polarizability: 0.00112(4) fm^{3}
- Magnetic moment: 1.41060679545(60)×10^{−26} J⋅T^{−1} 0.00152103220230(45) μ_{B} 2.79284734463(82) μ_{N}
- Magnetic polarizability: 1.9(5)×10^{−4} fm^{3}
- Spin: 1/2 ħ
- Isospin: 1/2
- Parity: +1
- Condensed: I(J^{P}) = 1/2(1/2^{+})

A proton is a stable subatomic particle, symbol p, H^{+}, or ^{1}H^{+} with a positive electric charge of +1 e (elementary charge). Its mass is slightly less than the mass of a neutron and approximately 1836 times the mass of an electron (the proton-to-electron mass ratio). Protons and neutrons, each with a mass of approximately one dalton, are jointly referred to as nucleons (particles present in atomic nuclei).

One or more protons are present in the nucleus of every atom. They provide the attractive electrostatic force binding the electrons. The number of protons in the nucleus is the defining property of an element, and is referred to as the atomic number (represented by the symbol Z). The number of protons and the matching number of electrons are unique to each element, determining chemical characteristics of the element.

The word proton is Greek for "first", and the name was given to the hydrogen nucleus by Ernest Rutherford in 1920. In previous years, Rutherford had discovered that the hydrogen nucleus (known to be the lightest nucleus) could be extracted from the nuclei of nitrogen by atomic collisions. Protons were therefore a candidate to be a fundamental or elementary particle, and hence a building block of nitrogen and all other heavier atomic nuclei.

Although protons were originally considered to be elementary particles, in the modern Standard Model of particle physics, protons are known to be composite particles, containing three valence quarks, and together with neutrons are now classified as hadrons. Protons are composed of two up quarks of charge +2/3e each, and one down quark of charge −1/3e. The rest masses of quarks contribute only about 1% of a proton's mass. The remainder of a proton's mass is due to quantum chromodynamics binding energy, which includes the kinetic energy of the quarks and the energy of the gluon fields that bind the quarks together. The proton charge radius is around 0.841 fm but two different kinds of measurements give slightly different values.

At sufficiently low temperatures and kinetic energies, free protons will bind electrons in any matter they traverse.

Free protons are routinely used for accelerators for proton therapy or various particle physics experiments, with the most powerful example being the Large Hadron Collider.

== Description ==
Unsolved problem in physics
How do the quarks and gluons carry the spin of protons?
More unsolved problems in physics

Protons are spin-1/2 fermions and are composed of three valence quarks, making them baryons (a sub-type of hadrons). The two up quarks and one down quark of a proton are held together by the strong force, mediated by gluons. A modern perspective has a proton composed of the valence quarks (up, up, down), the gluons, and transitory pairs of sea quarks. Protons have a positive charge distribution, which decays approximately exponentially, with a root mean square charge radius of about 0.8 fm.

Protons and neutrons are both nucleons, which may be bound together by the nuclear force to form atomic nuclei. The nucleus of the most common isotope of the hydrogen atom (with the chemical symbol "H") is a lone proton. The nuclei of the heavy hydrogen isotopes deuterium and tritium contain one proton bound to one and two neutrons, respectively. All other types of atomic nuclei are composed of two or more protons and various numbers of neutrons.

== History ==
The concept of a hydrogen-like particle as a constituent of other atoms was developed over a long period. As early as 1815, William Prout used early values of atomic weight to devise what later researchers called Prout's hypothesis: all atoms are composed of integer combinations of hydrogen atoms (which he called "protyles"). When more accurate values of the atomic weights were measured, the integer relationship failed. Nevertheless the concept continued to intrigue scientists and would eventually emerge again a century later.

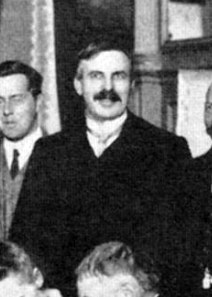
Ernest Rutherford at the first Solvay Conference, 1911

Proton detected in an isopropanol cloud chamber

In 1886, Eugen Goldstein discovered canal rays (also known as anode rays) exiting from perforations in the discharge tube. Wilhelm Wien in 1898 showed that these rays had a charge opposite to the negative electrons discovered by J. J. Thomson, but with a much higher mass to charge ratio. Later that year Thomson was able to determine a value for the magnitude of the electric charge, e, and show that the canal rays included material with charge-to-mass ratio (q/m) consistent with the hydrogen ion.

Following the discovery of the atomic nucleus by Ernest Rutherford in 1913, Antonius van den Broek proposed that the place of each element in the periodic table (its atomic number) is equal to its nuclear charge. Van den Broek speculated that the nucleus contained alpha particles with four positive charges and two electrons, the first version of the nuclear-electron hypothesis. (The modern model of two positive protons and two neutrons would take many years to discover). Also in 1913 Niels Bohr presented a theory of atomic structure which predicted electronic transitions related to nuclear charge. This was confirmed experimentally by Henry Moseley in 1913 when he showed that the energy of X-ray spectra lines of many elements followed a pattern based on atomic number.

In 1919, after a long series of sporadic experiments interrupted by WWI, Rutherford discovered what he called artificial disintegration of nitrogen atoms. Using alpha particles from radium to strike air, Rutherford detected scintillation on a zinc sulfide screen at a distance, up to 28 cm, well beyond the distance of alpha-particle range of travel but instead corresponding to the range of travel of hydrogen atoms. By 1920 he concluded that these hydrogen nuclei were a constituent part of the nitrogen nucleus. This result has been described as the discovery of protons.

When Rutherford described his results at the British Association for the Advancement of Science August 1920 he was asked by Oliver Lodge for a new name for the positive hydrogen nucleus to avoid confusion with the neutral hydrogen atom. Rutherford initially suggested both proton (the neuter singular of the Greek word for "first", πρῶτον) and prouton (after Prout). Rutherford later reported that the meeting had accepted his suggestion that the hydrogen nucleus be named the "proton", following Prout's word "protyle". The first use of the word "proton" in the scientific literature appeared in 1920.

Rutherford initially assumed that the alpha particle merely knocked a proton out of nitrogen, turning it into carbon. Patrick Blackett's cloud chamber images in 1925 demonstrated that the alpha particle was absorbed. If the alpha particle were not absorbed, then three charged particles, a negatively charged carbon, a proton, and an alpha particle, would be expected. The three charged particles would create three tracks in the cloud chamber, but only two tracks in the cloud chamber were observed. Blackett proposed that the alpha particle is absorbed by the nitrogen atom. Heavy oxygen (^{17}O), not carbon, was the product. This was the first reported nuclear reaction, ^{14}N + α → ^{17}O + p.

== Occurrence ==
One or more bound protons are present in the nucleus of every atom. Free protons are found naturally in a number of situations in which energies or temperatures are high enough to separate them from electrons, for which they have some affinity. Free protons occur occasionally on Earth: thunderstorms can produce protons with energies of up to several tens of megaelectronvolt. Free protons exist in plasmas in which temperatures are too high to allow them to combine with electrons. Free protons of high energy and velocity make up 90% of cosmic rays, which propagate through the interstellar medium. Free protons are emitted directly from atomic nuclei in some rare types of radioactive decay. Protons also result (along with electrons and antineutrinos) from the radioactive decay of free neutrons, which are unstable.

== Stability ==
Unsolved problem in physics
Are protons fundamentally stable? Or do they decay with a finite lifetime as predicted by some extensions to the Standard Model?
More unsolved problems in physics

The spontaneous decay of free protons has never been observed, and protons are therefore considered stable particles according to the Standard Model. However, some grand unified theories (GUTs) of particle physics predict that proton decay should take place with lifetimes between 10^{31} and 10^{36} years. The experimental lower bound for the mean lifetime is 0.96×10^{30} years.

The mean lifetime measures decay to any product. Lifetimes for decay to specific products are also measured. For example, experiments at the Super-Kamiokande detector in Japan gave lower limits for proton mean lifetime of 1.6×10^{34} years for decay to an antimuon and a neutral pion, and 2.4×10^{34} years for decay to a positron and a neutral pion.

Protons are known to transform into neutrons through the process of electron capture (also called inverse beta decay). For free protons, this process does not occur spontaneously but only when energy is supplied. The equation is:

p^{+} + e^{−} → n + ν_{e}

The process is reversible; neutrons can convert back to protons through beta decay, a common form of radioactive decay. In fact, a free neutron decays this way, with a mean lifetime of about 15 minutes. A proton can also transform into a neutron through beta plus decay (β+ decay).

According to quantum field theory, the mean proper lifetime of protons $\tau_\mathrm{p}$ becomes finite when they are accelerating with proper acceleration $a$, and $\tau_\mathrm{p}$ decreases with increasing $a$. Acceleration gives rise to a non-vanishing probability for the transition p^{+} → n + e^{+} + ν_{e}. This was a matter of concern in the later 1990s because $\tau_\mathrm{p}$ is a scalar that can be measured by the inertial and coaccelerated observers. In the inertial frame, the accelerating proton should decay according to the formula above. However, according to the coaccelerated observer the proton is at rest and hence should not decay. This puzzle is solved by realizing that in the coaccelerated frame there is a thermal bath due to Fulling–Davies–Unruh effect, an intrinsic effect of quantum field theory. In this thermal bath, experienced by the proton, there are electrons and antineutrinos with which the proton may interact according to the processes:

1. p^{+} + e^{−} → n + ν,
2. p^{+} + ν̅ → n + e^{+} and
3. p^{+} + e^{−} + ν̅ → n.

Adding the contributions of each of these processes, one should obtain $\tau_\mathrm{p}$.

== Mass ==
=== Electron ratio ===
The proton-electron mass ratio is a fundamental dimensionless physical constant μ = m_{p}/m_{e} = 1836.152673426(32). Astrophysical measurements show this value has been constant as far back as 10 billions years ago.

=== Quantum chromodynamics ===
In quantum chromodynamics, the modern theory of the nuclear force, most of the mass of protons and neutrons is explained by special relativity. The mass of a proton is about 80–100 times greater than the sum of the rest masses of its three valence quarks, while the gluons have zero rest mass. The extra energy of the quarks and gluons in a proton, as compared to the rest energy of the quarks alone in the QCD vacuum, accounts for almost 99% of the proton's mass. The rest mass of a proton is, thus, the invariant mass of the system of moving quarks and gluons that make up the particle, and, in such systems, even the energy of massless particles confined to a system is still measured as part of the rest mass of the system.

Two terms are used in referring to the mass of the quarks that make up protons: current quark mass refers to the mass of a quark by itself, while constituent quark mass refers to the current quark mass plus the mass of the gluon particle field surrounding the quark. These masses typically have very different values. The kinetic energy of the quarks that is a consequence of confinement is a contribution (see Mass in special relativity). Using lattice QCD calculations, the contributions to the mass of the proton are the quark condensate (~9%, comprising the up and down quarks and a sea of virtual strange quarks), the quark kinetic energy (~32%), the gluon kinetic energy (~37%), and the anomalous gluonic contribution (~23%, comprising contributions from condensates of all quark flavors).

The constituent quark model wavefunction for the proton is
$$\mathrm{|p_\uparrow\rangle = \tfrac{1}{\sqrt {18}} \left(2| u_\uparrow d_\downarrow u_\uparrow \rangle + 2| u_\uparrow  u_\uparrow d_\downarrow \rangle + 2| d_\downarrow u_\uparrow   u_\uparrow \rangle - | u_\uparrow u_\downarrow d_\uparrow\rangle  -| u_\uparrow d_\uparrow u_\downarrow\rangle  - | u_\downarrow d_\uparrow u_\uparrow\rangle
- | d_\uparrow u_\downarrow u_\uparrow\rangle  - |d_\uparrow  u_\uparrow u_\downarrow\rangle-| u_\downarrow u_\uparrow d_\uparrow\rangle\right)}.$$

The internal dynamics of protons are complicated, because they are determined by the quarks' exchanging gluons, and interacting with various vacuum condensates. Lattice QCD provides a way of calculating the mass of a proton directly from the theory to any accuracy, in principle. The most recent calculations claim that the mass is determined to better than 4% accuracy, even to 1% accuracy (see Figure S5 in Dürr et al.). These claims are still controversial, because the calculations cannot yet be done with quarks as light as they are in the real world. This means that the predictions are found by a process of extrapolation, which can introduce systematic errors. It is hard to tell whether these errors are controlled properly, because the quantities that are compared to experiment are the masses of the hadrons, which are known in advance.

These recent calculations are performed by massive supercomputers, and, as noted by Boffi and Pasquini: "a detailed description of the nucleon structure is still missing because ... long-distance behavior requires a nonperturbative and/or numerical treatment ..." More conceptual approaches to the structure of protons are: the topological soliton approach originally due to Tony Skyrme and the more accurate AdS/QCD approach that extends it to include a string theory of gluons, various QCD-inspired models like the bag model and the constituent quark model, which were popular in the 1980s, and the SVZ sum rules, which allow for rough approximate mass calculations. These methods do not have the same accuracy as the more brute-force lattice QCD methods, at least not yet.

== Charge radius ==
The CODATA recommended value of a proton's charge radius is 8.4075(64)×10^{−16} m. The radius of the proton measured by electron–proton scattering differs from the value measured via the Lamb shift in muonic hydrogen (an exotic atom made of a proton and a negatively charged muon). As a muon is 200 times heavier than an electron, resulting in a smaller atomic orbital, it is much more sensitive to the proton's charge radius and thus allows a more precise measurement. Subsequent improved scattering and electron-spectroscopy measurements agree with the new small radius. Work continues to refine and check this new value.

A third kind of high precision measurement agrees most closely with the value given by the muonic hydrogen spectroscopy but unexplained differences remain. The exact nature of what these measurement mean has also been questioned.

=== Pressure inside the proton ===
Since the proton is composed of quarks confined by gluons, an equivalent pressure that acts on the quarks can be defined. The size of that pressure and other details about it are controversial.

In 2018 this pressure was reported to be on the order 10^{35} Pa, which is greater than the pressure inside a neutron star. It was said to be maximum at the centre, positive (repulsive) to a radial distance of about 0.6 fm, negative (attractive) at greater distances, and very weak beyond about 2 fm. These numbers were derived by a combination of a theoretical model and experimental Compton scattering of high-energy electrons. However, these results have been challenged as also being consistent with zero pressure and as effectively providing the pressure profile shape by selection of the model.

=== Charge radius in solvated proton, hydronium ===
The radius of the hydrated proton appears in the Born equation for calculating the hydration enthalpy of hydronium.

== Interaction of free protons with ordinary matter ==
Although protons have affinity for oppositely charged electrons, this is a relatively low-energy interaction and so free protons must lose sufficient velocity (and kinetic energy) in order to become closely associated and bound to electrons. High energy protons, in traversing ordinary matter, lose energy by collisions with atomic nuclei, and by ionization of atoms (removing electrons) until they are slowed sufficiently to be captured by the electron cloud in a normal atom.

However, in such an association with an electron, the character of the bound proton is not changed, and it remains a proton. The attraction of low-energy free protons to any electrons present in normal matter (such as the electrons in normal atoms) causes free protons to stop and to form a new chemical bond with an atom. Such a bond happens at any sufficiently "cold" temperature (that is, comparable to temperatures at the surface of the Sun) and with any type of atom. Thus, in interaction with any type of normal (non-plasma) matter, low-velocity free protons do not remain free but are attracted to electrons in any atom or molecule with which they come into contact, causing the proton and molecule to combine. Such molecules are then said to be "protonated", and chemically they are simply compounds of hydrogen, often positively charged. Often, as a result, they become so-called Brønsted acids. For example, a proton captured by a water molecule in water becomes hydronium, the aqueous cation H_{3}O^{+}.

== Proton in chemistry ==
=== Atomic number ===
In chemistry, the number of protons in the nucleus of an atom is known as the atomic number, which determines the chemical element to which the atom belongs. For example, the atomic number of chlorine is 17; this means that each chlorine atom has 17 protons and that all atoms with 17 protons are chlorine atoms. The chemical properties of each atom are determined by the number of (negatively charged) electrons, which for neutral atoms is equal to the number of (positive) protons so that the total charge is zero. For example, a neutral chlorine atom has 17 protons and 17 electrons, whereas a Cl^{−} anion has 17 protons and 18 electrons for a total charge of −1 e.

All atoms of a given element are not necessarily identical, however. The number of neutrons may vary to form different isotopes, and energy levels may differ, resulting in different nuclear isomers. For example, there are two stable isotopes of chlorine: ^{35}_{17}Cl with 35 − 17 = 18 neutrons and ^{37}_{17}Cl with 37 − 17 = 20 neutrons.

=== Hydrogen ion ===
Protium, the most common isotope of hydrogen, consists of one proton and one electron (it has no neutrons). The term hydrogen ion (H^{+}) implies that that H-atom has lost its one electron, causing only a proton to remain. Thus, in chemistry, the terms proton and hydrogen ion (for the protium isotope) are used synonymously.

The proton is a unique chemical species, being a bare nucleus. As a consequence it has no independent existence in the condensed state and is invariably found bound by a pair of electrons to another atom.

— Ross Stewart, The Proton: Application to Organic Chemistry (1985, p. 1)

In chemistry, the term proton refers to the hydrogen ion, H^{+}. Since the atomic number of hydrogen is 1, a hydrogen ion has no electrons and corresponds to a bare nucleus, consisting of a proton (and 0 neutrons for the most abundant isotope protium ^{1}_{1}H). The proton is a "bare charge" with only about 1/64,000 of the radius of a hydrogen atom, and so is extremely reactive chemically. The free proton, thus, has an extremely short lifetime in chemical systems such as liquids and it reacts immediately with the electron cloud of any available molecule. In aqueous solution, it forms the hydronium ion, H_{3}O^{+}, which in turn is further solvated by water molecules in clusters such as [H_{5}O_{2}]^{+} and [H_{9}O_{4}]^{+}.

The transfer of H^{+} in an acid–base reaction is usually referred to as "proton transfer". The acid is referred to as a proton donor and the base as a proton acceptor. Likewise, biochemical terms such as proton pump and proton channel refer to the movement of hydrated H^{+} ions.

The ion produced by removing the electron from a deuterium atom is known as a deuteron, not a proton. Likewise, removing an electron from a tritium atom produces a triton.

=== Proton nuclear magnetic resonance (NMR) ===
Also in chemistry, the term proton NMR refers to the observation of hydrogen-1 nuclei in (mostly organic) molecules by nuclear magnetic resonance. This method uses the quantized spin magnetic moment of the proton, which is due to its angular momentum (or spin), which in turn has a magnitude of one-half the reduced Planck constant. ($\hbar/2$). The name refers to examination of protons as they occur in protium (hydrogen-1 atoms) in compounds, and does not imply that free protons exist in the compound being studied.

== Human exposure ==
The Apollo Lunar Surface Experiments Packages (ALSEP) determined that more than 95% of the particles in the solar wind are electrons and protons, in approximately equal numbers.

Because the Solar Wind Spectrometer made continuous measurements, it was possible to measure how the Earth's magnetic field affects arriving solar wind particles. For about two-thirds of each orbit, the Moon is outside of the Earth's magnetic field. At these times, a typical proton density was 10 to 20 per cubic centimeter, with most protons having velocities between 400 and 650 kilometers per second. For about five days of each month, the Moon is inside the Earth's geomagnetic tail, and typically no solar wind particles were detectable. For the remainder of each lunar orbit, the Moon is in a transitional region known as the magnetosheath, where the Earth's magnetic field affects the solar wind, but does not completely exclude it. In this region, the particle flux is reduced, with typical proton velocities of 250 to 450 kilometers per second. During the lunar night, the spectrometer was shielded from the solar wind by the Moon and no solar wind particles were measured.

Protons also have extrasolar origin from galactic cosmic rays, where they make up about 90% of the total particle flux. These protons often have higher energy than solar wind protons, and their intensity is far more uniform and less variable than protons coming from the Sun, the production of which is heavily affected by solar proton events such as coronal mass ejections.

Research has been performed on the dose-rate effects of protons, as typically found in space travel, on human health. To be more specific, there are hopes to identify what specific chromosomes are damaged, and to define the damage, during cancer development from proton exposure. Another study looks into determining "the effects of exposure to proton irradiation on neurochemical and behavioral endpoints, including dopaminergic functioning, amphetamine-induced conditioned taste aversion learning, and spatial learning and memory as measured by the Morris water maze. Electrical charging of a spacecraft due to interplanetary proton bombardment has also been proposed for study. There are many more studies that pertain to space travel, including galactic cosmic rays and their possible health effects, and solar proton event exposure.

The American Biostack and Soviet Biorack space travel experiments have demonstrated the severity of molecular damage induced by heavy ions on microorganisms including Artemia cysts.

== Antiproton ==
CPT-symmetry puts strong constraints on the relative properties of particles and antiparticles and, therefore, is open to stringent tests. For example, the charges of a proton and antiproton must sum to exactly zero. This equality has been tested to one part in 10^{8}. The equality of their masses has also been tested to better than one part in 10^{8}. By holding antiprotons in a Penning trap, the equality of the charge-to-mass ratio of protons and antiprotons has been tested to one part in 6×10^{9}. The measured magnetic moments of protons and antiprotons have been found to be equal and opposite within 0.8 ppm.

== See also ==
- Fermionic field
- Hydrogen
- Hydron (chemistry)
- List of particles
- Proton–proton chain
- Quark model
- Proton spin crisis
- Proton therapy
