= Quantum chromodynamics binding energy =

Energy that binds quarks into hadrons

Quantum chromodynamics binding energy (QCD binding energy), gluon binding energy or chromodynamic binding energy is the energy binding quarks together into hadrons. It is the energy of the field of the strong force, which is mediated by gluons. Motion-energy and interaction-energy contribute most of the hadron's mass.

== Source of mass ==
Most of the mass of hadrons is actually QCD binding energy, through mass–energy equivalence. This phenomenon is related to chiral symmetry breaking. In the case of nucleons —protons and neutrons— QCD binding energy forms about 99% of the nucleon's mass.

The kinetic energy of the hadron's constituents, moving at near the speed of light, contributes greatly to the hadron mass; otherwise most of the rest is actual QCD binding energy, which emerges in a complex way from the potential-like terms in the QCD Lagrangian.

For protons, the sum of the rest masses of the three valence quarks (two up quarks and one down quark) is approximately 9.4 MeV/c^{2}, while the proton's total mass is about 938.3 MeV/c^{2}. In the standard model, this "quark current mass" can nominally be attributed to the Higgs interaction. For neutrons, the sum of the rest masses of the three valence quarks (two down quarks and one up quark) is approximately 11.9 MeV/c^{2}, while the neutron's total mass is about 939.6 MeV/c^{2}. Considering that nearly all of the atom's mass is concentrated in the nucleons, this means that about 99% of the mass of everyday matter (baryonic matter) is, in fact, chromodynamic binding energy.

== Gluon energy ==
While gluons are massless, they still possess energy — chromodynamic binding energy. In this way, they are similar to photons, which are also massless particles carrying energy — photon energy. The amount of energy per single gluon, or "gluon energy", cannot be directly measured, though a distribution can by inferred from deep inelastic scattering (DIS) experiments (see ref [4] for an old but still valid introduction.) Unlike photon energy, which is quantifiable, described by the Planck–Einstein relation and depends on a single variable (the photon's frequency), no simple formula exists for the quantity of energy carried by each gluon. While the effects of a single photon can be observed, single gluons have not been observed outside of a hadron. A hadron is in totality composed of gluons, valence quarks, sea quarks and other virtual particles.

The gluon content of a hadron can be inferred from DIS measurements. Again, not all of the QCD binding energy is gluon interaction energy, but rather, some of it comes from the kinetic energy of the hadron's constituents. Currently, the total QCD binding energy per hadron can be estimated through a combination of the factors mentioned. In the future, studies into quark–gluon plasma will better complement the DIS studies and improve our understanding of the situation.

== See also ==
- Gluon
- Quark
- Current quark and constituent quark
- Hadron
- Strong force
- Quantum chromodynamics
- Chiral symmetry breaking
- Photon energy
- Invariant mass and relativistic mass
- Binding energy
