= Portrait of Giovanni Agostino della Torre and his son Niccolò =

1515 painting by Lorenzo Lotto

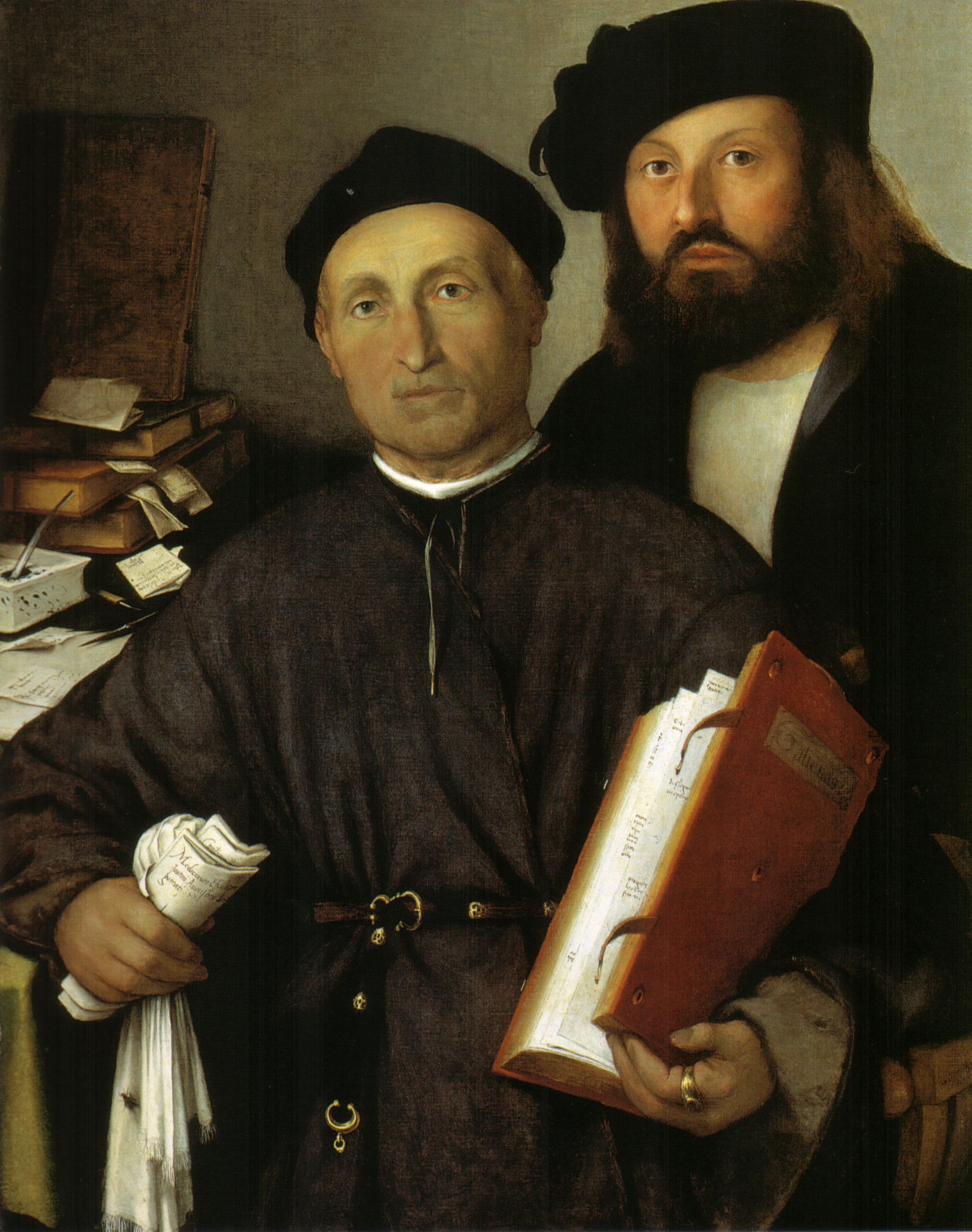
Portrait of Giovanni Agostino della Torre and his son Niccolò (1515) by Lorenzo Lotto

Portrait of Giovanni Agostino della Torre and his son Niccolò is an oil-on-canvas painting by Lorenzo Lotto, created in 1515, and now in the National Gallery, London. It is signed and dated "L.[aurentius] Lotus P.[inxit] / 1515". Its subjects have been identified via inscriptions scattered throughout the painting. They both practised medicine and pharmacy in Bergamo, selling iron vitriol from a shop on Piazza Vecchia.

This painting was probably the first portrait Lotto produced in that city. It was retained by its subjects' descendants until 1812, when it was sold to an art dealer. The National Gallery accepted Giovanni Morelli's recommendation to buy it in 1863.
