= Tiramisu (disambiguation) =

Tiramisu is an Italian dessert.

Tiramisu may also refer to:

- Android Tiramisu, version of operating system with the codename "Tiramisu".
- Tiramisu (2002 film), Cantonese film
- Tiramisu (2008 film), Dutch film
- Tirami Su, 1987 jazz album by Al Di Meola
- Tirami Su, classical ensemble led by Erin Headley
- "Tiramisu" (song), a 2025 song by Don Toliver
- "Tirami Su", German song by Heinz Rudolf Kunze from Der Golem Aus Lemgo (1994)
- "Tirami su", Italian song by Irene Fornaciari from Vertigini in fiore (2007)
- "Tirami Su", German song by Roberto Blanco
- Princess Tiramisu, from Kaeru no Tame ni Kane wa Naru.
