= Constance Jocelyn Ffoulkes =

British art historian, translator, and scholar

Constance Jocelyn Ffoulkes (1858–1950) was a British art historian, translator, and scholar of Italian Renaissance art. She participated in the adoption of the 'historical standpoint' method of research, a shift in art criticism that emerged in the early twentieth century. She was a student of Giovanni Morelli and his methods of connoisseurship, which involved assembling subtle clues and recognition of personal technique, the artist's 'hand', to determine a work's provenance and creators. She translated Morelli's Kunstkritische Studien über italienische Malerei and was instrumental in the communication of Morelli's methods and legacy.

Ffoulkes' own techniques involved the investigation of historical documentation, which came to be used by many modern art historians in support of their conclusions. For example, her article on Vincenzo Foppa published in The Burlington Magazine in 1903 made use of a document from an archive in Brescia to establish Foppa's death date. Ffoulkes' works include contributions to the Encyclopædia Britannica, instruction on scientific methodologies for analysis of artworks, the first major study of Foppa, and contributions to the journals Repertorium für Kunstwissenschaft, Rassegna d’arte, The Burlington Magazine, and The Magazine of Art.
