= Lira da braccio =

Musical instrument

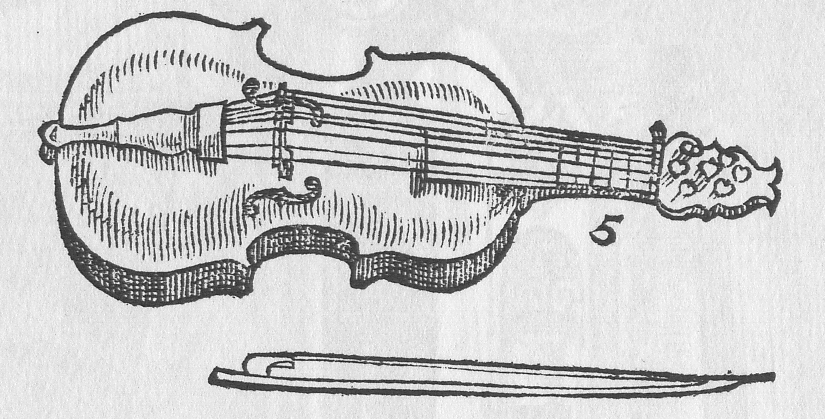
- "Lyra de bracio" as illustrated by Michael Praetorius in his Syntagma Musicum
- Other names: Lyra de bracio
- Classification: Bowed string instrument
- Developed: 15th century

Related instruments
- Lirone; Vielle

The lira da braccio (or lira de braccio or lyra de bracio) was a European bowed string instrument of the Renaissance. It was used by Italian poet-musicians in court in the 15th and 16th centuries to accompany their improvised recitations of lyric and narrative poetry. It is most closely related to the medieval fiddle, or vielle, and like the vielle had a leaf-shaped pegbox with frontal pegs. Fiddles with drone strings are seen beginning in the 9th century (Byzantine lyra), and the instrument continued to develop through the 16th century. In many depictions of the instrument, it is being played by mythological characters, frequently members of angel consorts, and most often by Orpheus and Apollo. The lira da braccio was occasionally used in ensembles, particularly in the intermedi, and may have acted as a proto-continuo instrument.

The instrument was shaped essentially like a violin, but with a wider fingerboard and flatter bridge. Generally, it had seven strings, five of them tuned like a violin with a low d added to the bottom (that is, d–g–d'–a'–e'') with two strings off the fingerboard which served as drones and were usually tuned in octaves. Michael Praetorius shows the instrument with frets, although he is the only one to do so (see image at right). The wide fingerboard and flat bridge, along with long, strongly curved bows, facilitated chordal playing on the instrument. Although Praetorius depicts the instrument as lyra de bracio with various viols "da gamba" (see image), it was in fact played on the shoulder, as is implied by its name, which refers to the arm, or braccio in Italian. From the few treatises and compositions which survive, it seems that the lira was played with triple and quadruple stops. The player was somewhat limited in terms of what inversions they could play, and it is believed that the top strings may have been used for melody, and the lower strings for chordal playing. In addition, it is believed that when accompanying singing, the instrument played at a higher pitch than the performer sang. Eventually in the late 16th century a fretted bass version of the lira da braccio with an expanded number of strings was developed, the lirone, also known as the lira da gamba, which was played "da gamba", or between the legs.

== History ==
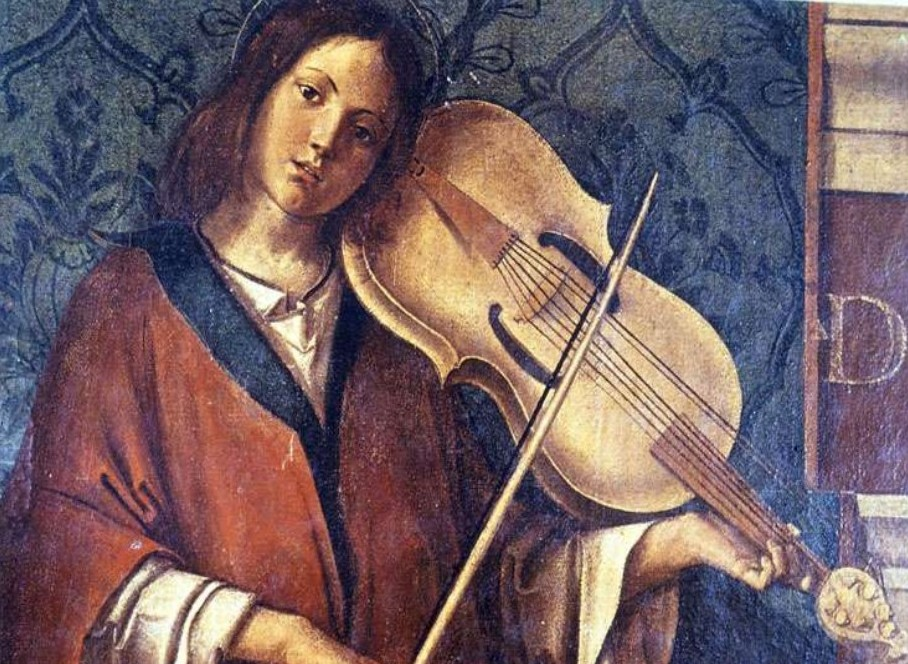
Lira da braccio player by Bartolomeo Montagna, c. 1500

The lira da braccio was first cited in 1533 by Giovanni Maria Lanfranco (using the term "seven-stringed lyra"), also describing its tuning: [c-c' / g-g'-d'-a'-e]. Lira was devised to accompany humanist sung verse by poets, such as the 14th century Petrarch and his later imitators, and was popular in the North Italian city-states such as Florence, Ferrara, Mantua, Venice and so on. In this role, the Lira enjoyed a prestige among instruments that it was never quite to achieve again. Amongst its exponents at the time were several great painters, notably Leonardo da Vinci, who according to Emmanuel Winternitz, was widely held to be the doyen among performers upon the Lira.

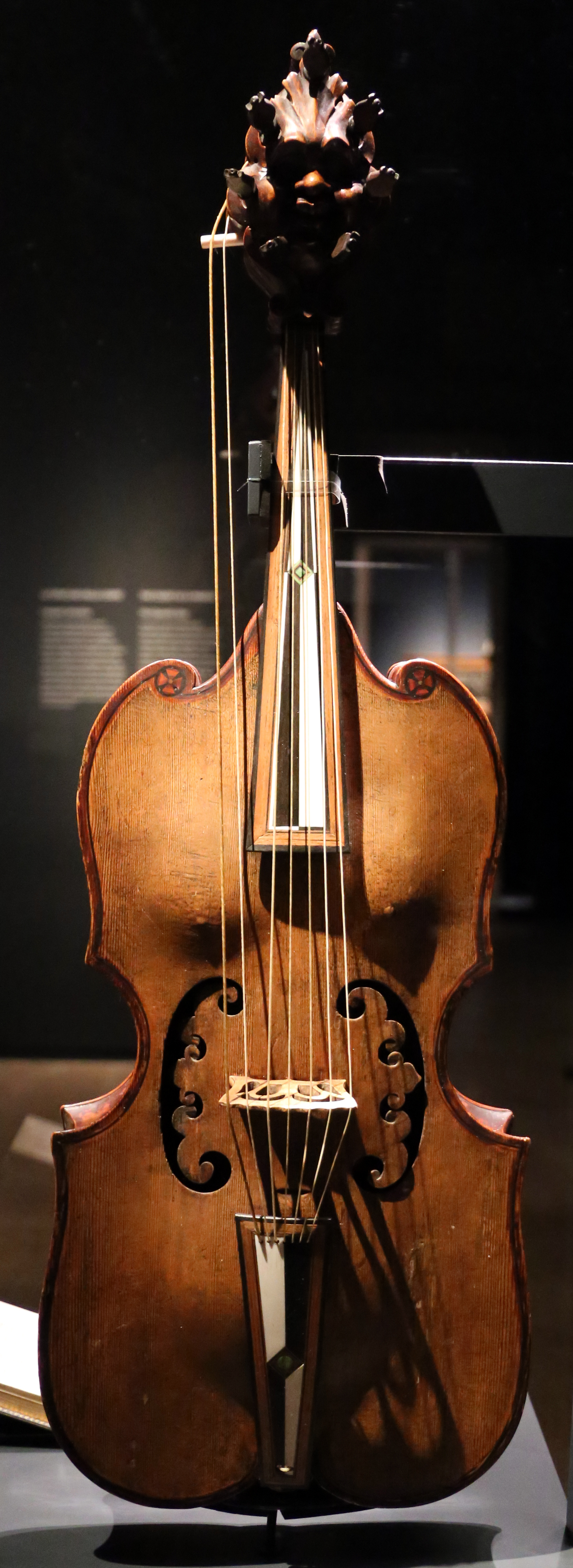
Lira da braccio by Giovanni d'Andrea, (1511). Kunsthistorisches Museum Vienna

The rise of the madrigal, and its counterpart, the instrumental consort, as well as the meteoric rise of the more vocal Violin, soon toppled the Lira from its pre-eminent position at court, and by the 1530s it had been relegated to stage use, in the great Renaissance festivals held by the city states and their powerful ruling dynasties. Here it was typically found onstage associated with the presence of the god Apollo, or blended in proto-continuo offstage ensembles.

The Pesaro Manuscript, from the mid-16th century, an important document in the history of the Lira, records a Passemezzo Moderno, (contemporary dance measure) written in lira tablature. Discovered in the town of Pesaro, on the Adriatic coast, this strange, mutilated script is the sole surviving example of written music for the Lira. It suggests at least the possibility that the instrument was being used as a dance instrument by this time. Its harmonic character, and useful range of home keys would have been ideally suited to render the fashionable dance music of the day.

The Italian musicologist Disertori showed that it was possible to reconstruct highly convincing examples of the lira da braccio in its early forms, from the meticulous paintings and drawings of Leonardo da Vinci, Raphael, Giovanni Bellini, Vittore Carpaccio and many other artists from the late 15th/early 16th century, thus opening many exciting possibilities relating to the re-creation of late 15th century performance practice.

There are up to ten surviving examples of the later, violin-like Lira, though their authenticity is still in, somewhat acrimonious, contention.

== See also ==
- Lirone
- Vielle
