= Jaynie Anderson =

Australian art historian, biographer, writer and curator

Jaynie Anderson AM FAHA OSI
- Born: 15 December 1944 (age 81); Melbourne, Australia
- Citizenship: Australia, United Kingdom
- Scientific career
- Fields: Art History, Curatorship, Conservation, Italian Renaissance Art, Australian Art History
- Workplaces: University of Melbourne, Melbourne, Australia; Australian Academy of the Humanities; CIHA - Comité International d'Histoire de l'Art; National Gallery of Art, Washington; J. Paul Getty Museum, Los Angeles; Kunsthistorisches Museum, Vienna; Institut national d'histoire de l'art (INHA), Paris; Ruskin School of Drawing and Fine Art, University of Oxford, Oxford, England; Villa I Tatti, The Harvard University Center for Italian Renaissance Studies, Florence

Jaynie Louise Anderson AM FAHA OSI (born 15 December 1944) is an Australian art historian, writer and curator of exhibitions, known for her publications and exhibitions on Giorgione and Venetian painting. Anderson is a Professor Emeritus at the University of Melbourne. She was the Herald Chair of Fine Arts at the University of Melbourne from 1997 until 2014, and was President of International Committee of the History of Art (Comité International d'Histoire de l'Art, CIHA) from 2008 to 2012.

== Academic career ==
She studied at the University of Melbourne and Bryn Mawr College, Philadelphia. In 1970 she was elected the first woman Rhodes Fellow at St Hugh's College, Oxford. She remained as a lecturer in art history at the Ruskin School of Drawing and Fine Art, from 1975 to 1996.

In 1997 Anderson was appointed Herald Chair of Fine Arts at the University of Melbourne, a post she held until 2014. Her monograph on Giorgione (1996/7) remains one of the most authoritative studies of the artist.

Anderson was elected a Fellow of the Australian Academy of the Humanities in 1999.

In 2008 Anderson was elected president of the International Committee of the History of Art (Comité International d'Histoire de l'Art, CIHA), in which role she developed global art history until 2012.

In 2009 she was appointed Foundation Director of the Australian Institute of Art History.

In 2015 she received an Italian knighthood from the President of the Republic of Italy, the only art historian to have been awarded the Order of the Star of Italy (Ufficiale dell’Ordine della Stella d’Italia), for her outstanding contribution to the study of Venetian art history, especially Giorgione.

In 2019, Anderson published the first full biography of the 19th-century Italian art critic Giovanni Morelli.

In the 2021 Queen's Birthday Honours Anderson was appointed a Member of the Order of Australia for "significant service to tertiary education, particularly to art history in Australia".

== Writings ==
- Giorgione: The Painter of Poetic Brevity. Paris/New York, 1997.
- Collecting, Connoisseurship and the Art Market in Risorgimento Italy: Giovanni Morelli's Letters to Giovanni Melli and Pietro Zavaritt (1866 - 1872). Venice: Istituto Veneto, 1999.
- Tiepolo's Cleopatra. Melbourne: Palgrave Macmillan, 2003.
- Crossing Cultures: Conflict, Migration and Convergence. The Proceedings of the 32nd International Congress in the History of Art. The Miegunyah Press, Melbourne University Publishing, Melbourne, 2009.
- The Cambridge Companion to Australian Art, Cambridge, 2011.
- The Restoration of Renaissance Painting in Mid Nineteenth-century Milan: Giuseppe Molteni in Correspondence with Giovanni Morelli. Florence: Edifir, 2014.
- The Creation of Indigenous Collections in Melbourne: How Kenneth Clark, Charles Mountford, and Leonhard Adam Interrogated Australian Indigeneity. Musée du Quai Branly, Paris
- Unconstrained Passions. The Architect’s House as a Museum, Lyon Housemuseum, 2016.
- The Life of Giovanni Morelli in Risorgimento Italy. Milan: Officina Libraria, 2019.
- The Invention of Melbourne: A Baroque Archbishop and a Gothic Architect, edited by Jaynie Anderson, Max Vodola, and Shane Carmody. Melbourne University Publishing, 2019.
