= Schmelzer =

Schmelzer is a surname. Derived forms of the name include Smelser, Smelcer, Schmeltzer, Smelzer, Smeltzer and Schmelzer, Schmeltzer.

There is some dispute regarding the origin of this name. It may be derived from Schmelz, Saarland, Germany, or from German: schmelzen (to smelt).

Notable people with the surname include:

- Dave Schmelzer (born 1962), American writer and playwright
- Deirdre Smeltzer (born 1964), American mathematician
- Devin Smeltzer (born 1995), American baseball player
- Heinrich Schmelzer (1914–1985), German SS officer
- Johann Heinrich Schmelzer (c.1620–1680), Austrian composer and violinist
- Marcel Schmelzer (born 1988), German footballer
- Norbert Schmelzer (1921–2008), Dutch politician
