= Atalante Migliorotti =

Italian musician

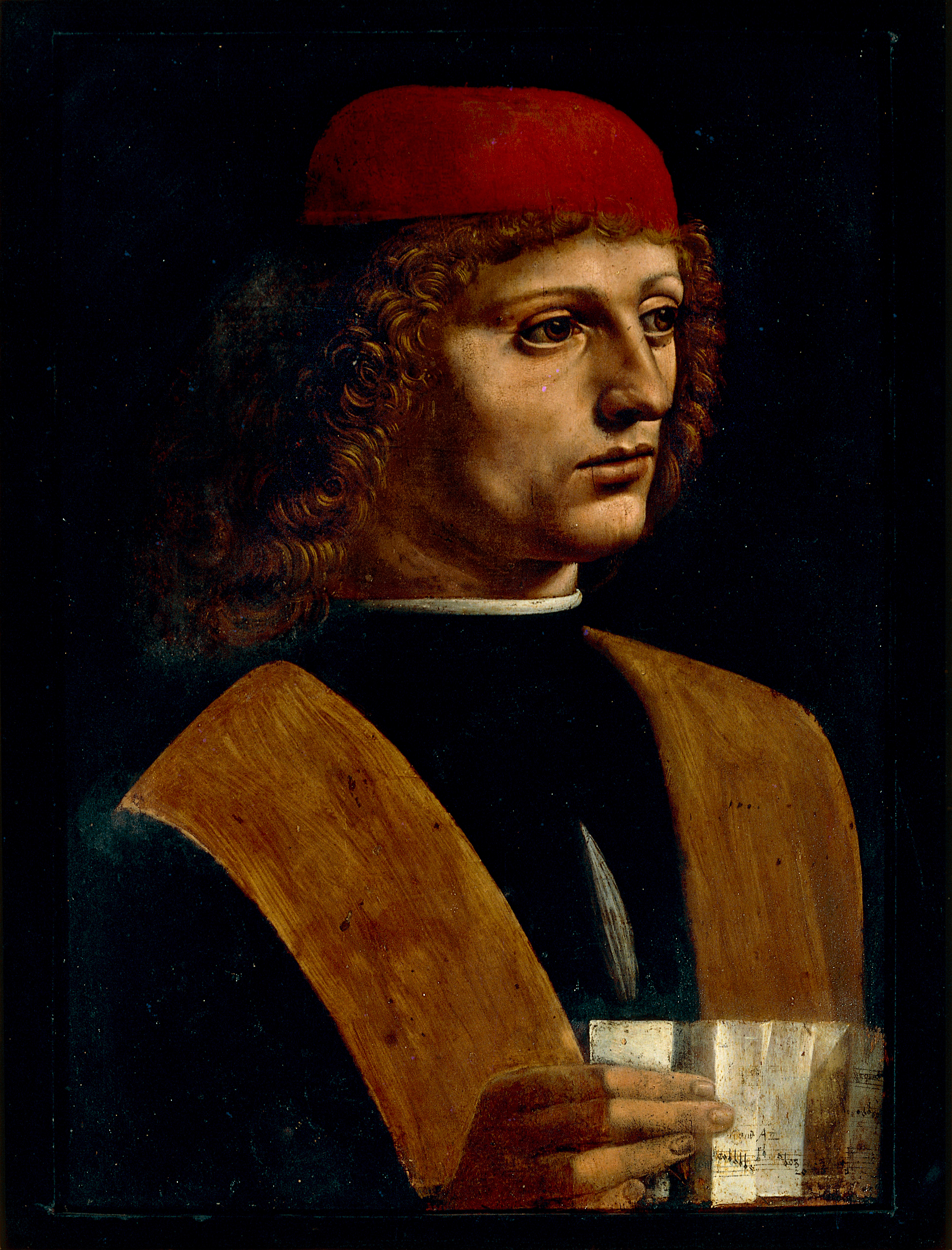
The Portrait of a Musician by Leonardo da Vinci, thought to be of Atalante Migliorotti

Atalante Migliorotti (1466 in Florence – 1532) was an Italian Renaissance musician, instrument maker and assistant to Leonardo da Vinci.

He was born of an illegitimate relationship. After being a pupil of Leonardo, who taught him music, he moved to Milan in 1482 to accompany his master. That same year, Leonardo is recorded as having painted his portrait; this is believed to be the Portrait of a Musician in the Pinacoteca di Brera, Milan.

In 1491, according to the wishes of Isabella d'Este, he sang the lead role in the opera on the subject of Orpheus, presented at the carnival in Marmirolo. His skills as a lutenist and lutemaker led, in 1493, to a commission from Isabella for a guitar, and in 1505 to another for a lirone, or twelve-stringed viol, played chordally.

He was also employed as coordinator of construction of St. Peter's Basilica.
