= Pasquini =

Pasquini is an Italian surname. Notable people with the surname include:

- Barbara Pasquini, Italian physicist
- Bernardo Pasquini (1637–1710), Italian Baroque composer
- Bruno Pasquini (1914–1995), Italian racing cyclist
- Domenico Pasquini (1740–1798), Italian painter
- Ercole Pasquini (c.1560–1608 or 1619), Italian composer and organist
- Federico Pasquini (born 1973), Italian professional basketball coach and general manager
- Francesca Pasquini (born 1981), Italian-born French politician
- Giovanni Claudio Pasquini (1695–1763), Italian poet and librettist
- José María Pasquini Durán (1939–2010), Argentine journalist, writer, teacher and political analyst
- Pierre Pasquini (1921–2006), French politician
- Nicolás Pasquini (born 1991), Argentine professional footballer
- Riccardo Pasquini (1849–1937), Italian painter
- Stefano Pasquini (born 1969), Italian artist and writer
- Dave Rodgers (born Giancarlo Pasquini, 1963), Italian songwriter, composer, and producer
