= Constituent quark =

A constituent quark is a current quark with a notional "covering" induced by the renormalization group.

In the low-energy limit of QCD, a description by means of perturbation theory is not possible: Here, no asymptotic freedom exists, but collective interactions between valence quarks and sea quarks gain strongly in significance. Part of the effects of virtual quarks and virtual gluons in the "sea" can be assigned to a quark so well that the term "constituent quark" can serve as an effective description of the low-energy system.

Constituent quarks appear like "dressed" current quarks, i.e. current quarks surrounded by a cloud of virtual quarks and gluons. This cloud, in the end, underlies the large constituent-quark masses.

Definition
Constituent quarks are valence quarks for which the correlations for the description of hadrons by means of gluons and sea-quarks are put into effective quark masses of these valence quarks.

The effective quark mass is called constituent quark mass. Hadrons consist of "glued" constituent quarks.

== Binding energy ==
The quantum chromodynamic binding energy of a valence quark in a hadron is the amount of energy required to make the hadron spontaneously emit a meson containing the valence quark. This is the same as the constituent-quark mass.

Note that the following values are model-dependent.

Constituent quark	Mass
Up quark (u)	336 MeV/c^{2}
Down quark (d)	340 MeV/c^{2}
Strange quark (s)	486 MeV/c^{2}
Charm quark (c)	1550 MeV/c^{2}
Bottom quark (b)	4730 MeV/c^{2}
Top quark (t)	177000 MeV/c^{2}
