= Connoisseur =

Subject-matter expert

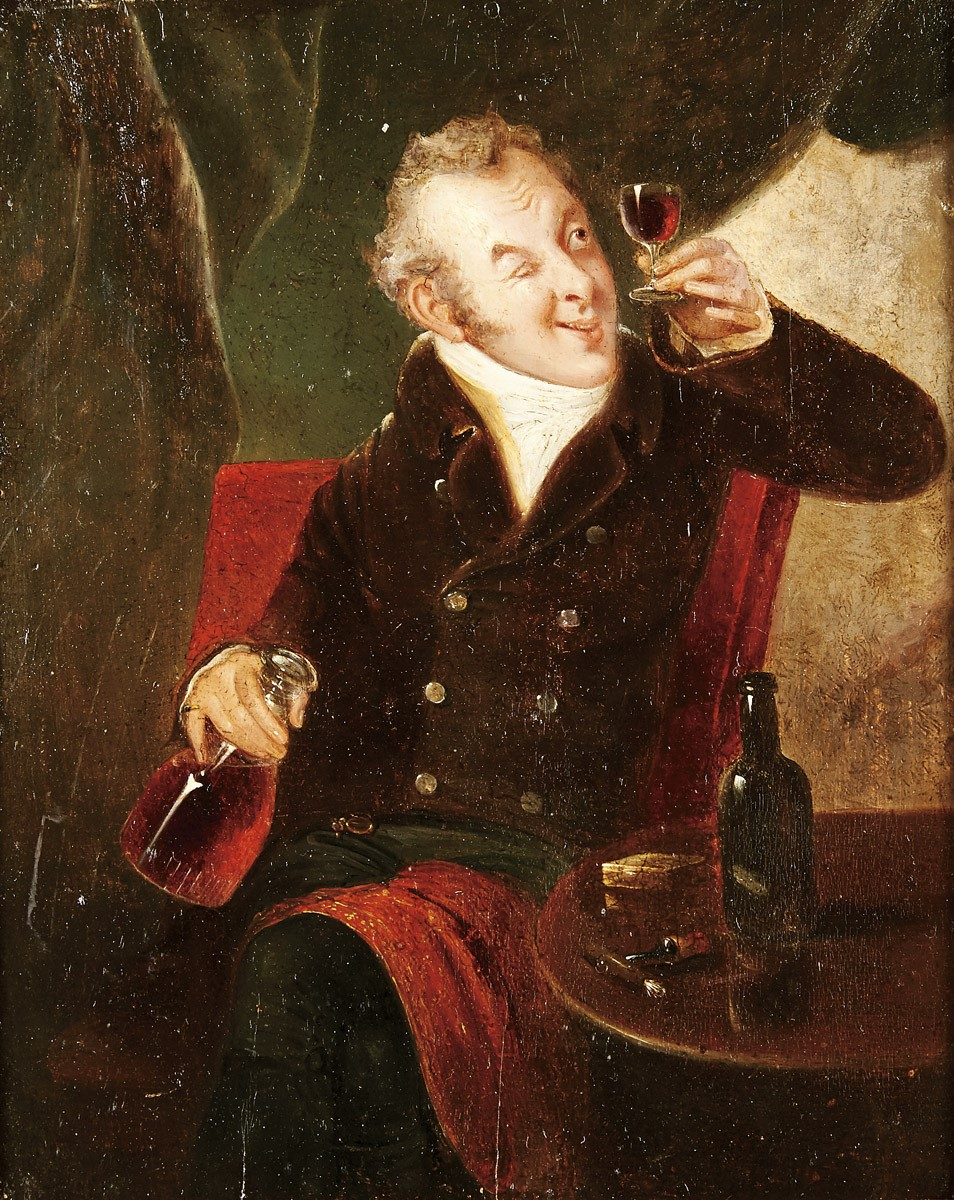
"Testing the Wine", English School, 19th century.

A connoisseur (French traditional, pre-1835, spelling of connaisseur, from Middle-French connoistre, then connaître meaning 'to be acquainted with' or 'to know somebody/something') is a person who has a great deal of knowledge about the fine arts; who is a keen appreciator of cuisines, fine wines, and other gourmet products; or who is an expert judge in matters of taste. In many areas, the term now has an air of pretension, and may be used in a partly ironic sense. In the art trade, however, expert connoisseurship remains a crucial skill for the identification and attribution to individual artists of works by the style and technique, where documentary evidence of provenance is lacking. The situation in the wine trade is similar, for example in assessing the potential for ageing in a young wine through wine tasting.

== Connoisseurship in art ==
"The ability to tell almost instinctively who painted a picture is defined ... as connoisseurship". Connoisseurs evaluate works of art on the basis of their experience of the style and technique of artists. Judgment informed by intuition is essential, but it must be grounded in a thorough understanding of the work itself. On the basis of empirical evidence, refinement of perception about technique and form, and a disciplined method of analysis, the responsibility of the connoisseur is to attribute authorship, validate authenticity and appraise quality. These findings are crucial for the valuation of works, and can be collected and organized into a catalogue raisonné of the work of a single artist or a school.

In his Meaning in the Visual Arts (1955), Erwin Panofsky explains the difference between a connoisseur and an art historian: "The connoisseur might be defined as a laconic art historian, and the art historian as a loquacious connoisseur."

The English dealer and art historian, Philip Mould says, "it is about noticing things which have specific characteristics of the artists involved, as opposed to general characteristics of the era". He points out the importance of condition and understanding what the artist originally painted (as opposed to how the painting now looks). His colleague, Bendor Grosvenor takes the view that connoisseurship is learned by looking at paintings and cannot be taught in the classroom. He believes that it has become unfashionable in the world of art history and as a result, activities such as producing a catalogue raisonné are undervalued by the art history establishment. Svetlana Alpers confirms the reservations of art historians that the identification of individual style in works is "essentially assigned to a group of specialists in the field known as conoisseurs". Nonetheless, Christie's Education offers an MA in the History of Art and the Art Market that includes a seminar on connoisseurship. This covers "the critical skills needed to look at art, write about art, research and evaluate works, including handling and viewing art objects and visiting artists' studios, conservation labs and museums."

=== Earlier views of connoisseurship ===
During the 18th century, the term was often used as a synonym for a still vaguer man of taste or a pretend critic.

In 1760, Oliver Goldsmith said, "Painting is and has been and now will someday become the sole object of fashionable care; the title of connoisseur in that art is at present the safest passport into every fashionable Society; a well timed shrug, an admiring attitude and one or two exotic tones of exclamation are sufficient qualifications for men of low circumstances to curry favour."

In 1890, Giovanni Morelli wrote, "art connoisseurs say of art historians that they write about what they do not understand; art historians, on their side, disparage the connoisseurs, and only look upon them as the drudges who collect materials for them, but who personally have not the slightest knowledge of the physiology of art."

The attributions of painted pottery were an important project to the History of Ancient Art and Classical Archeology (Ancient Greece and South Italy). Two specialists were the most important authorities in archaeological connoisseurship: John Davidson Beazley (1885–1970) and Arthur Dale Trendall (1909–1995).

== Connoisseurs in other fields ==
Connoisseur is also used in the context of gastronomy, i.e. in connection with fine food, beer, wine, coffee, tea and many other products whose consumption can be pleasing to the senses.

== See also ==
- Amateur
- Appraiser
- Collector
- Expert
- Fan, aficionado, enthusiast
- Gourmet, gourmand
- Sommelier
