= Current quark =

Constituent quark cores (constituent quarks with no covering) of a valence quark

Current quarks (also called naked quarks or bare quarks) are a description of valence quarks as the cores of the quark particles that are the invariable parts of a hadron: their non-virtual ("real" or permanent) quarks with their surrounding "covering" of evanescent gluons and virtual quarks imagined stripped away. In quantum chromodynamics, the mass of the current quarks is called the current quark mass, as opposed to the much larger mass of the composite particle which is carried in the gluon and virtual-quark covering. The heavier quarks (Note: The so-called "heavy" quarks are the top (t), bottom (b), and charm (c) quarks. Their "naked" masses are all about 80% their "dressed" masses.) are large enough for their substantial masses to predominate over the combined mass of their virtual-particle "dressing" or covering, but the lighter quarks' (Note: The so-called "light" quarks are the up (u), down (d), and strange (s) quarks. Their "dressed" masses are all around 0.33~0.50 GeV, much larger than their "naked" masses, which tend to be around 0.05~0.20 GeV about 1 /5~1/ 20 th their "dressed" size.) masses are overwhelmed by their evanescent covering's mass-energy; the light quarks' core masses are such a small fraction of the covering that the actual mass values are difficult to infer with any accuracy (hence, the data listed below for the light quarks are fraught with caveats).

The constituent quark, in contrast, is a combination of both the "naked" current quark and its "dressing" of evanescent gluons and virtual quarks. For the lighter quarks, the mass of each constituent quark is approximately 1 /3 of the average mass of the proton and neutron, with a little extra mass fudged in for the strange quark.

== Abstraction vs. reality ==
Since it is not physically possible even at solar-interior temperatures to "strip naked" any quark of its covering, it is a matter of legitimate doubt whether current quarks are actual or real, or merely a convenient but unrealistic and abstract notion. High energy particle accelerators provide a demonstration that the idea of a "naked quark" is in some sense real: If the current quark imbedded in one constituent quark is hit inside its covering with large momentum, the current quark accelerates through its evanescent covering and leaves it behind, at least temporarily producing a "naked" or undressed quark, showing that to some extent the idea is realistic (see glueball for speculations about what happens to the dressing of virtual particles that gets left behind).

In addition, current quarks possess one asymptotic freedom within the limits described by perturbation theory.

The local term plays no more role for the description of the hadrons with the light current quarks. In the M̅S̅-scheme, at μ = 2 GeV/c^{2} , the quark masses are:

Current quark	Mass	Δx
Up quark (u)	1.8~2.8 MeV/c^{2}	20–40 fm
Down quark (d)	4.3~5.2 MeV/c^{2}	20–40 fm
Strange quark (s)	92~104 MeV/c^{2}	
Charm quark (c)	1.3 GeV/c^{2}	
Bottom quark (b)	4.2~4.7 GeV/c^{2}	
Top quark (t)	156~176 GeV/c^{2}	

For the lighter quarks a description with any accuracy is only possible with the help of relativistic quantum mechanics.

== Current quark mass ==
The current quark mass is also called the mass of the 'naked' quarks. The mass of the current quark is reduced by the term of the constituent quark covering mass.

The current quark mass is a logical consequence of the mathematical formalism of the quantum field theory (QFT), so the idea does not arise from a strictly descriptive report of observations. The current quark masses of the light current quarks are much smaller than the constituent quark masses. Reason for this is the missing of the mass of the constituent quark covering.

The current quark mass is a parameter to compute sufficiently small color charges.

Definition
The current quark mass means the mass of the constituent quark with the mass of the respective constituent quark covering subtracted away.

There is almost no difference between current quark mass and constituent quark mass for the heavy quarks; this is not at all the case for the light quarks.

The comparison of the results of the computations with the experimental data supplies the values for the current quark masses.
