= Lirone =

Musical instrument

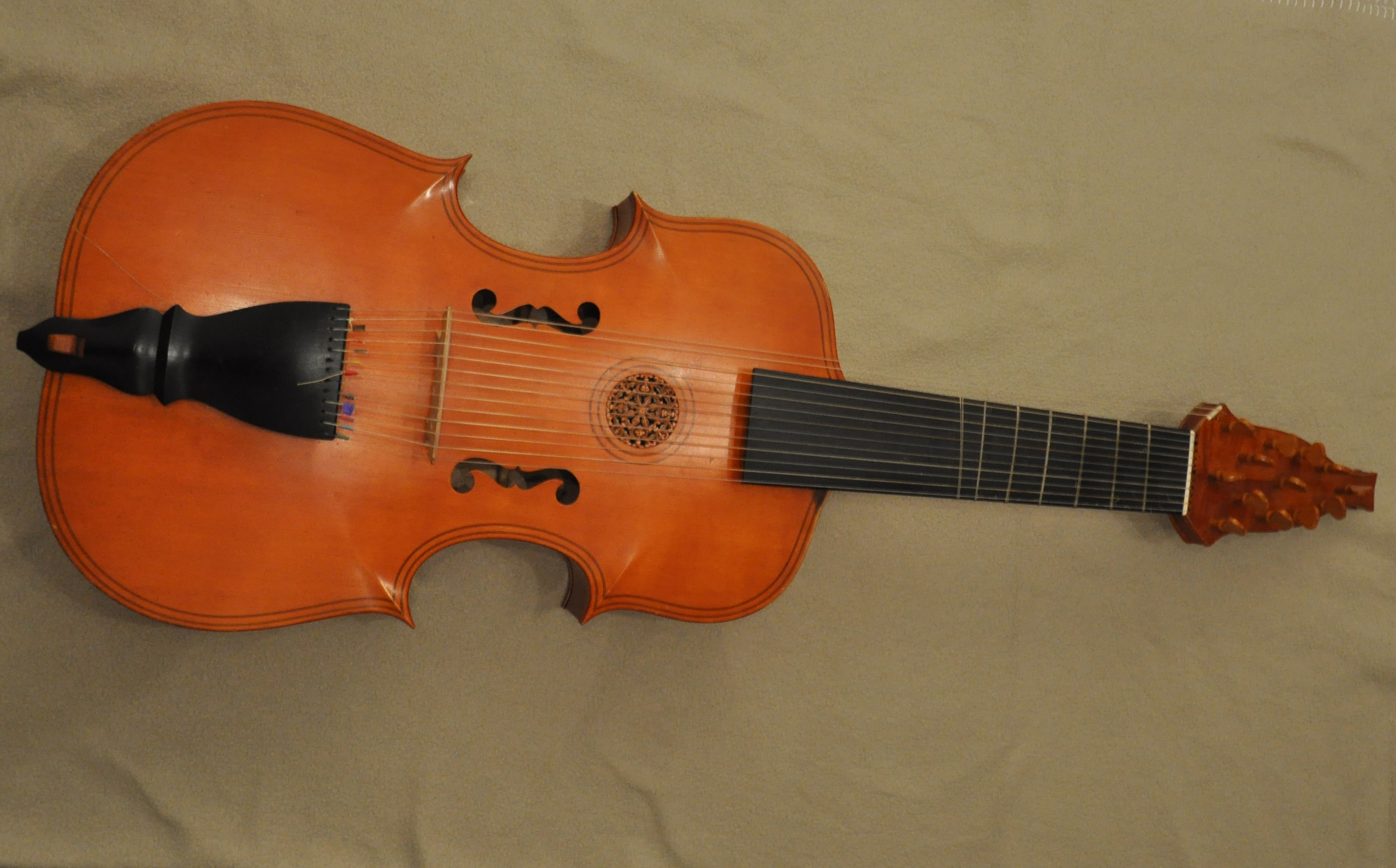
- Other names: Lira da gamba; lyrone; lyra da gamba
- Classification: Bowed string instrument

Related instruments
- Lira da braccio

The lirone (or lira da gamba) is the bass member of the lira family of instruments that was popular in the late 16th and early 17th centuries. It is a bowed string instrument with between 9 and 16 gut strings and a fretted neck. When played, it is held between the legs in the manner of a cello or viol (viola da gamba).

It was used in italian operas and oratoriums to accompany the human voice, especially the gods. Because the lira da gambe can not play the bass, there must be a bass instrument, theorbo, harpsichord or viola da gamba.

== Description ==
The Grove Dictionary of Music and Musicians describes the lirone as essentially a larger version of the lira da braccio, which has a similar wide fingerboard, flat bridge, and leaf-shaped pegbox with frontal pegs. Its flat bridge allows for the playing of chords of between three and five notes.

== History ==
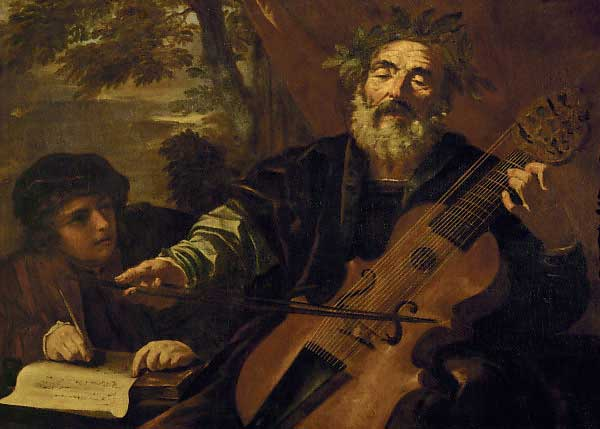
Lirone player painted by Pier Francesco Mola

The lirone was primarily used in Italy during the late 16th and early 17th centuries (and particularly in the time of Claudio Monteverdi) to provide continuo, or harmony for the accompaniment of vocal music. It was frequently used in Catholic churches, particularly by Jesuits.

== Performers ==
Despite the resurgence in Baroque instrument performance during the 20th century, only a handful of musicians play the lirone. Notable performers on the instrument include Erin Headley of England; Imke David, Claas Harders and Hille Perl of Germany; Annalisa Pappano of the United States; Laura Vaughan of Australia, and Paulina van Laarhoven of the Netherlands.

== See also ==
- Violone, a contrabass instrument of the viol family
