= Gustavo Frizzoni =

Italian art historian

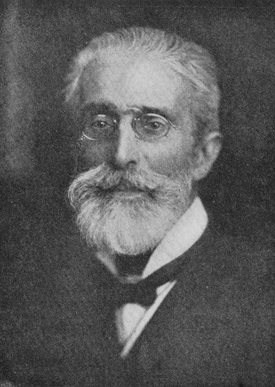

Gustavo Frizzoni (11 August 1840 – 10 February 1919) was an Italian art critic and art historian.

== Life ==
He was born in Bergamo to a family of Swiss origin. His father and brothers owned a silk factory and his father was a collector and bibliophile. Gustavo graduated from the University of Pisa in Italian literature in 1864 and in 1866 became a volunteer in Garibaldi's army in the Third Italian War of Independence. After the death of Frizzoni's father, the family friend and art historian Giovanni Morelli took over the education of Frizzoni and his brothers.

Under Morelli's influence Frizzoni became more and more interested in artistic subjects, publishing his first works in 1869 and following them up with more challenging texts in the following years. Some of his more important works were collected and published in 1891 as Arte italiana del Rinascimento.

In 1872 he was made a knight of the Order of the Crown of Italy. After his death in Milan his library and photographic archive were left to the Accademia di belle arti di Brera according to his wishes.

== Works ==
- Delle pitture di Baldassarre Peruzzi e del giudizio portatone dal Sig. Cavalcaselle, Roma, Tip. delle scienze mat. e fis., 1869.
- I pittori italiani dell'epoca del Rinascimento nella Reale Galleria di Berlino. Studio critico, Roma, Tipografia delle Scienze Matematiche e Fisiche, 1871.
- Di alcune insigni opere di scultura del XV e del XVI secolo esistenti in Mantova, Perugia, Tipografia G. Boncompagni e C., 1873.
- Lorenzo Lotto e le sue pitture nella cappella Suardi a Trescorre, Perugia, Tip. G. Boncompagni, 1875.
- Alessandro Bonvicino detto il Moretto, pittore bresciano e le fonti storiche a lui referentisi, Perugia, Tipografia G. Boncompagni e C., 1876.
- Napoli ne' suoi rapporti coll'arte del Rinascimento, Firenze, Cellini, 1878.
- L'arte dell'Umbria rappresentata nella nuova Pinacoteca comunale di Perugia, Firenze, Coi tipi di M. Cellini e C., 1880.
- Arte italiana nella galleria nazionale di Londra, Firenze, Cellini, 1880.
- Delle relazioni di Leonardo da Vinci coll'Oriente, Milano, Coi tipi della perseveranza, 1884.
- Collezione di quaranta disegni scelti dalla raccolta del senatore Giovanni Morelli riprodotti in eliotipia descritti ed illustrati dal Dr. Gustavo Frizzoni, Milano, Ulrico Hoepli, 1886.
- Arte italiana del Rinascimento. Saggi critici, Milano, Fratelli Dumolard, 1891.
- Serie di capolavori dell'arte italiana, Roma, Tip. dell'Unione cooperativa editrice, 1892.
- La Pinacoteca di Brera e il suo nuovo catalogo, Roma, Tipografia dell'Unione coop. ed., 1893.
- Iacopo Burckhardt nella persona, nei pensieri, nelle opere, Roma, Tipografia Forzani, 1898.
- Appunti critici intorno alle opere di pittura delle scuole italiane nella Galleria del Louvre, Roma, Unione cooperativa, 1906.
- In qual modo si possa impedire, senza ledere il diritto dei privati, che opere d'arte pregevoli continuino ad essere portate via dall'Italia, Venezia, Tip. C. Ferrari, 1908.
- Le gallerie di Milano, Bergamo, Istituto italiano d'arti grafiche, 1912.
- La pittura italiana dal Mantegna al Correggio, Roma, E. Calzone, 1914.
- Luigi Cavenaghi e i maestri dei tempi antichi, Roma, Direzione della Nuova antologia, 1918.

== External links (in Italian) ==
- Gianluca Kannes, Gustavo Frizzoni, in Dizionario biografico degli italiani, vol. 50, Roma, Istituto dell'Enciclopedia Italiana, 1998. URL consultato il 3 agosto 2018. Modifica su Wikidata
- I fratelli Gustavo e Teodoro Frizzoni tra arte e letteratura, Chiesa valdese - Comunità evangelica cristiana, Bergamo.
- G. Frizzoni, Le novità della Pinacoteca Ambrosiana, Bollettino d'Arte, 7, 1907
- G. Frizzoni, Autoritratti di Girolamo Romanino, Bollettino d'Arte, 6, 1908
- G. Frizzoni, La leggenda di S. Cristoforo interpretata da Tiziano e dal Monrealese, Bollettino d'Arte, 9, 1909
