= Dave Schmelzer =

American dramatist

Dave Schmelzer (born August 16, 1962) is an American author, playwright, and former pastor in the Association of Vineyard Churches. He is best known for his non-fiction book, Not The Religious Type, Confessions of a Turncoat Atheist, which details his movement away from atheism and towards the Christian faith, and for founding the Blue Ocean Summit, which gathers ministers and lay leaders interested in addressing matters of faith to a secular world.

== Biography ==
At 18, Schmelzer entered Stanford University as a devout atheist. His conversion experience, chronicled in Not the Religious Type, led to a growing involvement with his on-campus ministry and ongoing confusion; without a religious background, Schmelzer had to reconcile his secular upbringing with matters of faith. This interest with addressing God to a secular and Western audience has been a fundamental theme of his pastoral and authorial work. (See Published Works below)

In the late 1990s, Schmelzer and his wife, Grace, moved to Boston to help found the Vineyard Christian Fellowship of Cambridge Massachusetts - renamed to Greater Boston Vineyard in 2006 and transitioned to Reservoir Church in 2015. At the time, Cambridge (and the Boston area) had a less than 2% of church attendees on any given Sunday. During his tenure, the Boston Vineyard peaked at over 1,000 visitors and seeding several church plants, including The River NYC. Since leaving the Boston Vineyard in 2013, Schmelzer transitioned full-time to Blue Ocean Faith, the nonprofit spawned from the Blue Ocean Summit.

Schmezler holds a degree in literature from Stanford University and later received his M.A. in theology from Fuller Theological Seminary. He maintains the Blue Ocean Faith site, which mixes faith and secular thinking, along with other guest bloggers.

== Published works ==
- Blue Ocean Faith, 2017, Front Edge Publishing, LLC
- SEEK, 2010, Not Religious Inc.
- Blue Ocean Handbook, 2009, Not Religious Inc.
- Confessions of a Turncoat Atheist, 2008, SaltRiver
- Danny Comes Home, 2004, Crawlspace Press
