= Barbara Pasquini =

Italian physicist

Barbara Pasquini is an Italian physicist at the University of Pavia, where she is deputy director of the Department of Physics "Alessandro Volta". Her research studies hadrons using non-perturbative methods of quantum chromodynamics, focusing on medium-energy electroweak interactions in nucleon structure and resonances, and on the parton model and spin structure of hadrons.

== Education and career ==
Pasquini was a secondary student at the Liceo ginnasio statale Arnaldo in Brescia. She entered the University of Pavia as a student in the Collegio universitario Santa Caterina da Siena in 1989, and received a laurea (the Italian equivalent of a master's degree) from the university in 1994. Continuing her studies at the same university, she completed a Ph.D. in 1997 under the supervision of Sigfrido Boffi. Both her master's and doctoral research projects concerned Compton scattering.

In 1998 and 1999 she worked as a postdoctoral researcher at the University of Mainz, with the partial support of a Marie Curie Fellowship. In 2000 and 2001 she continued her postdoctoral research at the European Centre for Theoretical Studies in Nuclear Physics and Related Areas in Trento and at the University of Trento. She returned to the University of Pavia from 2003 to 2006, still as a postdoctoral researcher, with a brief return to the University of Mainz in early 2007. In 2007 she became a university researcher at the University of Pavia, in 2015 she obtained a position there as associate professor, and in 2022 she was promoted to full professor.

== Recognition ==
Pasquini was elected as a Fellow of the American Physical Society (APS) in 2020, after a nomination from the APS Topical Group on Hadronic Physics, "for important work developing and improving theoretical tools, including dispersion relations, light-front models, and Wigner distributions which increase the sensitivity of both low- and high-energy experiments such as Compton scattering and tomography, to the fundamental structure of hadrons".
