= Giovanni Morelli =

Italian art critic (1816–1891)

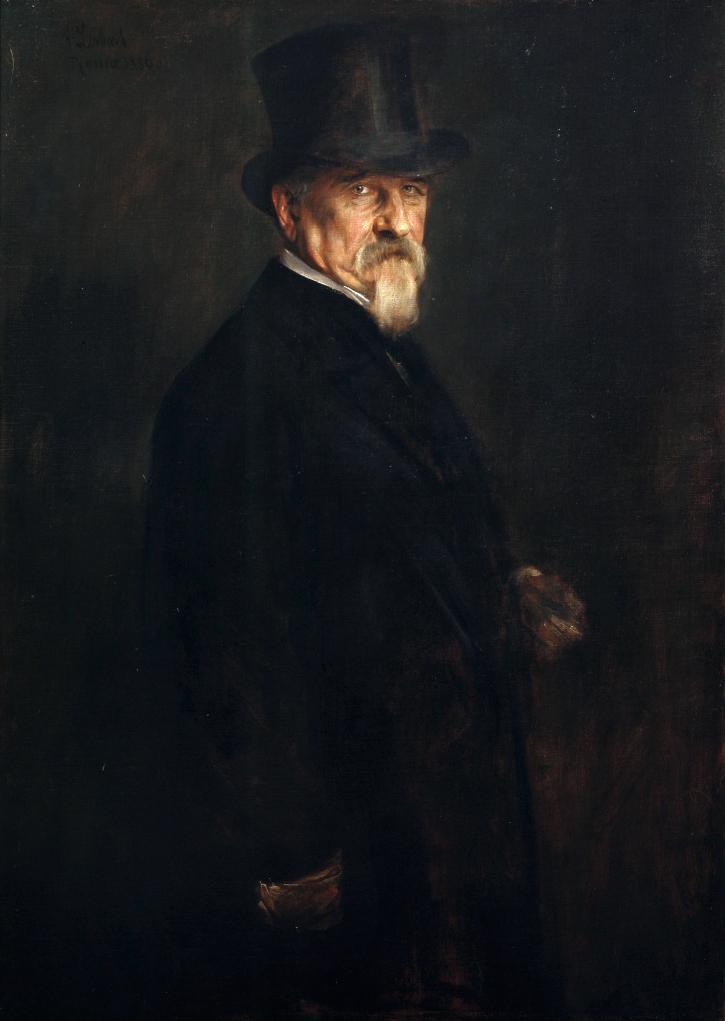
Giovanni Morelli

Giovanni Morelli (25 February 1816 – 28 February 1891) was an Italian art critic and political figure.

As an art historian, he developed the "Morellian" technique of scholarship, identifying the creators of works of art through scrutiny of diagnostic minor details that revealed artists' scarcely conscious shorthand and conventions for portraying, for example, ears.

He was born in Verona and died in Milan.

== Early life and training ==
Morelli studied medicine in Switzerland and Germany, where he taught anatomy at the Ludwig-Maximilians-Universität München. During this time, he also studied Goethe's morphology, Lavater's physiognomy, Friedrich Schelling's natural philosophy and befriended Bettina von Arnim. "Although Morelli qualified as a doctor, he never practiced as one.... His passion for anatomy and aversion to practicing medicine were consistent throughout his life."

Morelli accompanied "Louis Agassiz on his glacier expeditions" and "was obviously profoundly influenced" by him. Jaynie Anderson wrote:

The influence of Agassiz, as well as other scientists such as Cuvier and Darwin, combined with his developing interest in visual art and exposure to art historians of the calibre of Carl Friedrich von Rumohr, led Morelli to look at the art of the Italian Renaissance with an anatomist's eye. He found much greater satisfaction in the forms (Gestalten) of a Raphael, a Correggio, a Titian, a Michelangelo, or a Giulio Romano, than in the comparative demonstrations of osteology.

== Art historian ==
=== The Morellian method ===
The Morellian method is based on clues offered by trifling details rather than identities of composition and subject matter or other broad treatments that are more likely to be seized upon by students, copyists and imitators. Instead, as Carlo Ginzburg analysed the Morellian method, the art historian operates in the manner of a detective, "each discovering, from clues unnoticed by others, the author in one case of a crime, in the other of a painting". These unconscious traces — in the shorthand for rendering the folds of an ear in secondary figures of a composition, for example — are unlikely to be imitated and, once deciphered, serve as fingerprints do at the scene of the crime. The identity of the artist is expressed most reliably in the details that are least attended to.

The Morellian method has its nearest roots in Morelli's own discipline of medicine, with its identification of disease through numerous symptoms, each of which may be apparently trivial in itself. "Anatomical details were also important ... in determining authorship. For instance, with Titian the thumb is given a high rating, because Morelli identifies fifty works by that artist in which the base of a man's thumb is abnormally developed."

Morelli developed his method studying the works of Botticelli, and then applied it to attribute works to Botticelli's pupil, Filippino Lippi. His fully developed technique was published as Die Werke italienischer Meister in den Galerien von München, Dresden und Berlin (Italian Masters in German Galleries: A Critical Essay on the Italian Pictures in the Galleries of Munich, Dresden, Berlin) in 1880; it appeared under the anagrammatic pseudonym "Ivan Lermolieff". Morelli's "great antagonist, the art historian Wilhelm von Bode, even spoke of the spread of an epidemic of 'Lermolieffmania', after the mysterious Russian scholar 'Ivan Lermolieff' ... , in the German translation by an equally non-existent Johannes Schwarze, a resident of the imaginary Gorlaw, which is to say Gorle, near Bergamo". Today, the Morellian method extends to cognate disciplines, including literary studies.

Morelli's connoisseurship was developed to a high degree by Bernard Berenson, who met Morelli in 1890. The first generation of Morellian scholars also included Gustavo Frizzoni, Jean Paul Richter, Adolfo Venturi and Constance Jocelyn Ffoulkes.

=== Legacy as art historian ===
Morellian scholarship penetrated the English field from 1893, with the translation of his master work. The Morellian technique of connoisseurship was extended to the study of Attic vase-painters by J. D. Beazley and by Michael Roaf to the study of the Persepolis reliefs, with results that further confirmed its validity. Morellian recognition of "handling" in undocumented fifteenth- and sixteenth-century sculpture, in the hands of scholars like John Pope-Hennessy, has resulted in a broad corpus of securely attributed work. At the same time, modern examination of Classical Greek sculpture, in the wake of pioneering reassessments by Brunilde Sismondo Ridgway, has also turned away from attributions based on broad aspects of subject and style that are reflected in copies and later Roman classicizing pastiche.

"Morelli's volume on German galleries contains an overview of Giorgione's oeuvre.... It is here that he proposes that the Venus in the Dresden Gemäldegalerie is by Giorgione—his most famous attribution."

Jaynie Anderson wrote:

Since their first publication, Morelli's writings have been continually discussed ... by many ... such as the young Bernard Berenson. Morelli considered his method most effective in attributing Quattrocento painting, particularly with artists whose representations of physiognomy were rather bony, such as Botticelli and Filippino Lippi. He believed his method was eighty per cent accurate, and recent attempts to evaluate his success would confirm this estimate.

The complementary field of document-supported art history traces its origins to the somewhat earlier work of Joseph Archer Crowe and Giovanni Battista Cavalcaselle. Richard Wollheim wrote that Morelli contrasted

art-history, for which he had little time, ... and connoisseurship, which is his real subject.... [T]he art-historian is concerned with the broad sweep of art, seen by and large as just one aspect of culture or civilization ... while the connoisseur prefers to concentrate on individual works of art, and to try and establish what they are and to whom they should be attributed.... [The art-historian] will rely heavily on such external evidence as tradition and documents: whereas ... "the only true record for connosseur is the work of art itself".

The Morellian method of finding essence and hidden meaning in details has had a wide cultural influence. "A number of authors believe that Morelli actually inspired Freud's psychoanalytic method". In Freud's 1914 essay "The Moses of Michelangelo", Freud "interpreted the Morellian method as predictive of psychoanalysis". Freud wrote that Morelli had overturned —

erstwhile attributions.... He accomplished this by insisting that the general impression and the main features of a painting should be disregarded, and by stressing the distinctive import of minor details — of such trifles as the shape of the finger-nails, of the ear-lobes, of the halo ... which every artist executes in an idiosyncratic manner.... I do believe that his methodology is closely akin to the technique of medical psychoanalysis. It, too, is accustomed to divine from the little appreciated or unnoticed peculiarities — from the garbage (the "refuse") of observation — the secret and the concealed.

The Morellian method was re-examined by Richard Wollheim in "Giovanni Morelli and the Origins of Scientific Connoisseurship". Jaynie Anderson wrote, "Today connoisseurship matters as a fundamental skill in art history, and it is due to Morelli that it became scientific.... As art historians, we are all now Morellians to some degree."

== Collector and donor ==
Morelli began collecting art in the mid-1850s, "follow[ing] his own tastes and scholarly interests, but without a particular plan. He made his earliest acquisitions in the mid-1850s, with the Portrait of a Young Man by Ambrogio de Predis and the Saint John the Evangelist and Saint Martha by Bergognone." Morelli's collection expanded "mainly in the 1860s and early '70s ... partly thanks to the help of his cousin Giovanni Melli, who purchased several paintings for Morelli, which then came back to him by inheritance." Morelli acquired works "from Florence, Siena, and Umbria ... from ancient Tuscan families, and paintings from Emilia and Ferrara came from the sale of the prestigious Costabili Collection." These included "real gems" such as "The Young Smoker by Molenaer, [and] Botticelli's The Stories of Virginia, both of which were purchased at the Monte di Pietà auction in Rome, and Pisanello's Portrait of Leonello d'Este, bought in London."

Morelli's collection was completed in about 1874. It decorated the rooms of his residence in Via Pontaccio 14 in Milan, until Morelli’s death in 1891. Morelli bequeathed his collection to the Accademia Carrara at Bergamo (where it arrived in 1892), "which thus acquired the collection of one of the greatest art historians of the nineteenth century. In 1892, Gustavo Frizzoni, a friend and faithful follower of Morelli and his method, arranged the 117 paintings and 3 sculptures in two galleries of the museum named after the senator, which later appeared in a printed catalogue."

== Political career ==
Morelli was a "firm believer in the Unification of Italy ... [taking] part in the insurrectionary uprisings in Milan in 1848, and in 1860 he was appointed senator for his patriotic merits." "When asked about his own life," Jaynie Anderson writes:

Morelli always replied that he considered himself a politician, who had lived in Italy and who had worked tirelessly for his country: he saw his involvement with the art world as a marginal and later activity. His participation in the three Wars of Italian Independence, from 1848 to 1866, reveals a patriot who would risk everything — even his life on several occasions — for the love of family, friends, and country.

Jaynie Anderson adds that Morelli participated in the Risorgimento "as the popular elected member for Bergamo in the Camera dei Deputati for a decade, and later as a senator."

== Sources ==
- Anderson, Jaynie (2019). The Life of Giovanni Morelli in Risorgimento Italy. Milan: Officina Libraria. ISBN 978-88-99765-95-8. Reviewed by David Alan Brown, The Burlington Magazine, Vol. 163, January 2021, pp. 88–89. Reviewed by Jonathan Beckman, London Review of Books, Vol. 44, No. 2, 27 January 2022
- Ginzburg, Carlo (1984), "Morelli, Freud, and Sherlock Holmes: Clues and Scientific Method", in Umberto Eco; Thomas A. Sebeok (eds.), The Sign of Three: Dupin, Holmes, Peirce, Bloomington, Indiana: Indiana University Press, pp. 81–118, ISBN 978-0-253-35235-4. First published in History Workshop, No. 9 (Spring, 1980), pp. 5-36.
- Locatelli, Valentina (2011), Le teorie del primo Romanticismo tedesco nel pensierio sull'arte di Giovanni Morelli: Metamorfosi romantiche, Pasian di Prato (Udine), Italy: Le carte tedesche, Campanotto editore, ISBN 978-88-456-1202-2
- Locatelli, Valentina. "Italian Painters, Critical Studies of Their Works: Gemäldegalerie Alte Meister in Dresden. An overview of Giovanni Morelli’s attributions". Journal of Art Historiography.
- Morelli, Giovanni (1883). Italian Masters in German Galleries: A Critical Essay on the Italian Pictures in the Galleries of Munich—Dresden—Berlin. Translated by Mrs. Louise M. Richter. London: George Bell & Sons.
- Morelli, Giovanni (1907). Italian Painters: Critical Studies of Their Works. The Galleries of Munich and Dresden. Translated by Constance Jocelyn Ffoulkes. London: John Murray. The preface begins, "This volume ... is in the main a reproduction of my former book—'Italian Masters in German Galleries'—which has long been out of print. I have, however, added to and I trust improved it in certain parts".
- Morelli, Giovanni (1892). Italian Painters: Critical Studies of Their Works. The Borghese and Doria Pamfili Galleries in Rome. Translated by Constance Jocelyn Ffoulkes. London: John Murray.
- Dietrich Seybold, The Giovanni Morelli Monograph, Basel 2016
- Wollheim, Richard (1973). "Giovanni Morelli and the Origins of Scientific Connoisseurship". On Art and the Mind: Essays and Lectures. London: Allen Lane; Cambridge, Massachusetts: Harvard University Press.
