= Luke Syson =

English art historian and curator

Luke Syson is an English museum curator and art historian. Since 2019, he has been the director of the Fitzwilliam Museum at the University of Cambridge, prior to which he held positions at the British Museum (1991–2002), the Victoria and Albert Museum (2002–2003), the National Gallery (2003–2012) and the Metropolitan Museum of Art (2015–2019). In 2011 he curated the acclaimed Leonardo da Vinci exhibition at the National Gallery: Leonardo da Vinci: Painter at the Court of Milan, which included his pivotal role in the controversial authentication by the National Gallery of da Vinci's Salvator Mundi.

== Education and early career ==
Syson received a Bachelor of Arts from the Courtauld Institute of Art, University of London and he continued studying there for three years in the PhD program; his focus was on the 15th-century royal portraiture of Milan, Ferrara, and Mantua. His first professional positions was as the curator of medals at the British Museum from 1991 to 2002. Towards the end of his tenure, he served as co-curator for the Pisanello: Painter to the Renaissance Court exhibition in 2001 and co-created a new permanent gallery: "Enlightenment: Discovering the World in the Eighteenth Century", which opened in 2003. From 2002 to 2003 he subsequently served as a senior curator at the Victoria and Albert Museum, where had a leading role in creating the Medieval and Renaissance Galleries.

== National Gallery ==
He joined the National Gallery in 2003, where he was the head of research and curator of Italian Paintings before 1500. At the National Gallery, Syson led a successful effort in obtaining Raphael's Madonna of the Pinks. Syson was the curator of the Renaissance Siena: Art for a City exhibition in 2007.

In 2011, Syson was the head curator for the National Gallery's controversial Leonardo da Vinci: Painter at the Court of Milan exhibition, which was a major success. The exhibition centered around works from Leonardo's first Milanese period (c. 1482–1499), featuring an unprecedented amount of major works by Leonardo in one location, including the Portrait of a Musician, the Lady with an Ermine, La Belle Ferronnière, Madonna Litta, Saint Jerome in the Wilderness, Salvator Mundi and both the Louvre and London versions of the Virgin of the Rocks.

Through the Leonardo exhibition and efforts prior, Syson was pivotal in the full authentication of Salvator Mundi to Leonardo da Vinci (i.e. an "autograph work"), having five Leonardo experts (Note: The five experts invited by Luke Syson were: Carmen C. Bambach (Curator of Spanish and Italian Drawings, Metropolitan Museum of Art New York), David Allan Brown (Curator of Italian Painting, National Gallery of Art, Washington, D.C.), Maria Teresa Fiorio (Professor of Art History at the University of Milan, and Vice President of the Raccolta Vinciana, Milan), Martin Kemp (University of Oxford), Pietro C. Marani (Professor of Art History at the Politecnico di Milano).) inspect the painting at the museum. Author Ben Lewis later suggested in The Last Leonardo: The Secret Lives of the World's Most Expensive Painting that Syson had overstated the degree of agreement among the experts, with Carmen C. Bambach expressing skepticism after the museum announced the attribution. In the 2021 documentary The Lost Leonardo, one of the other experts invited by Syson, Maria Teresa Fiorio, denied that she had ever authenticated the painting, saying: "Nobody asked me a formal opinion about this painting".

In 2019, The Art Newspaper reported that it was "surprising that Syson's entry does not at least allude to the suggestion by other scholars that parts of the picture may have been painted by assistants, even if he went on to dismiss this idea". In November 2021, the Prado in Spain formally downgraded the attribution of the painting in their da Vinci exhibition catalog from "by Leonardo" to "attributed works, workshop of authorized and supervised by Leonardo". The curator of the Louvre's 2019–20 da Vinci exhibition, Vincent Delieuvin, wrote in the Prado catalog that the painting had "details of surprisingly poor quality", and that "It is to be hoped that a future permanent display of the work will allow it to be reanalysed with greater objectivity".

== Later career ==
Syson became the Iris and B. Gerald Cantor Chairman of European Sculpture and Decorative Arts at the Metropolitan Museum of Art (MET) in 2012. The same year he curated Plain or Fancy? Restraint and Exuberance in the Decorative Arts. While at the MET he led the $22 million renovation of the museum's British Galleries. In 2015, Syson was a candidate for the director of the National Gallery; the position later went to Gabriele Finaldi.

He became the director of the Fitzwilliam Museum in 2019, replacing Tim Knox.

== Exhibitions ==
- Pisanello: Painter to the Renaissance Court at the National Gallery, London (2001)
- Renaissance Siena: Art for a City at the National Gallery, London (2007)
- Leonardo da Vinci: Painter at the Court of Milan at the National Gallery, London (2011)
- Like Life: Sculpture, Color, and the Body at The Metropolitan Museum of Art, New York (2018)

== Selected publications ==
- Syson, Luke; Gorden, Dillian (2001). Pisanello: Painter to the Renaissance Court. London: National Gallery. ISBN 978-0-300-09108-3. OCLC 884633075.
- ——; Thornton, Dora (2001). Objects of Virtue: Art in Renaissance Italy. London: British Museum Press. ISBN 978-0-7141-2805-4.
- ——; Chapman, Hugo (2007). Siena nel Rinascimento: Arte per una città (in Italian). Milan: Silvana. ISBN 978-88-366-0937-6. OCLC 184821299. via London, England: National Gallery (Note: Syson was the lead author)
- ——; Keith, Larry; Galansino, Arturo; Mazzotta, Antoni; Nethersole, Scott; Rumberg, Per (2011). Leonardo da Vinci: Painter at the Court of Milan. London: National Gallery. ISBN 978-1-85709-491-6. OCLC 938763590.
- ——; Wagstaff, Sheena; Bowyer, Emerson; Kumar, Brinda (2018). Like Life: Sculpture, Color, and the Body. New York: Metropolitan Museum of Art. ISBN 978-1-58839-644-0. OCLC 1002666590.

== See also ==
- The Lost Leonardo, a 2021 film that features Luke Syson
