= Compositional Sketches for the Virgin Adoring the Christ Child, with and without the Infant St. John the Baptist =

1480s sketch by Leonardo da Vinci

Compositional Sketches for the Virgin Adoring the Christ Child, with and without the Infant St. John the Baptist; Diagram of a Perspectival Projection (recto); Slight Doodles (verso)
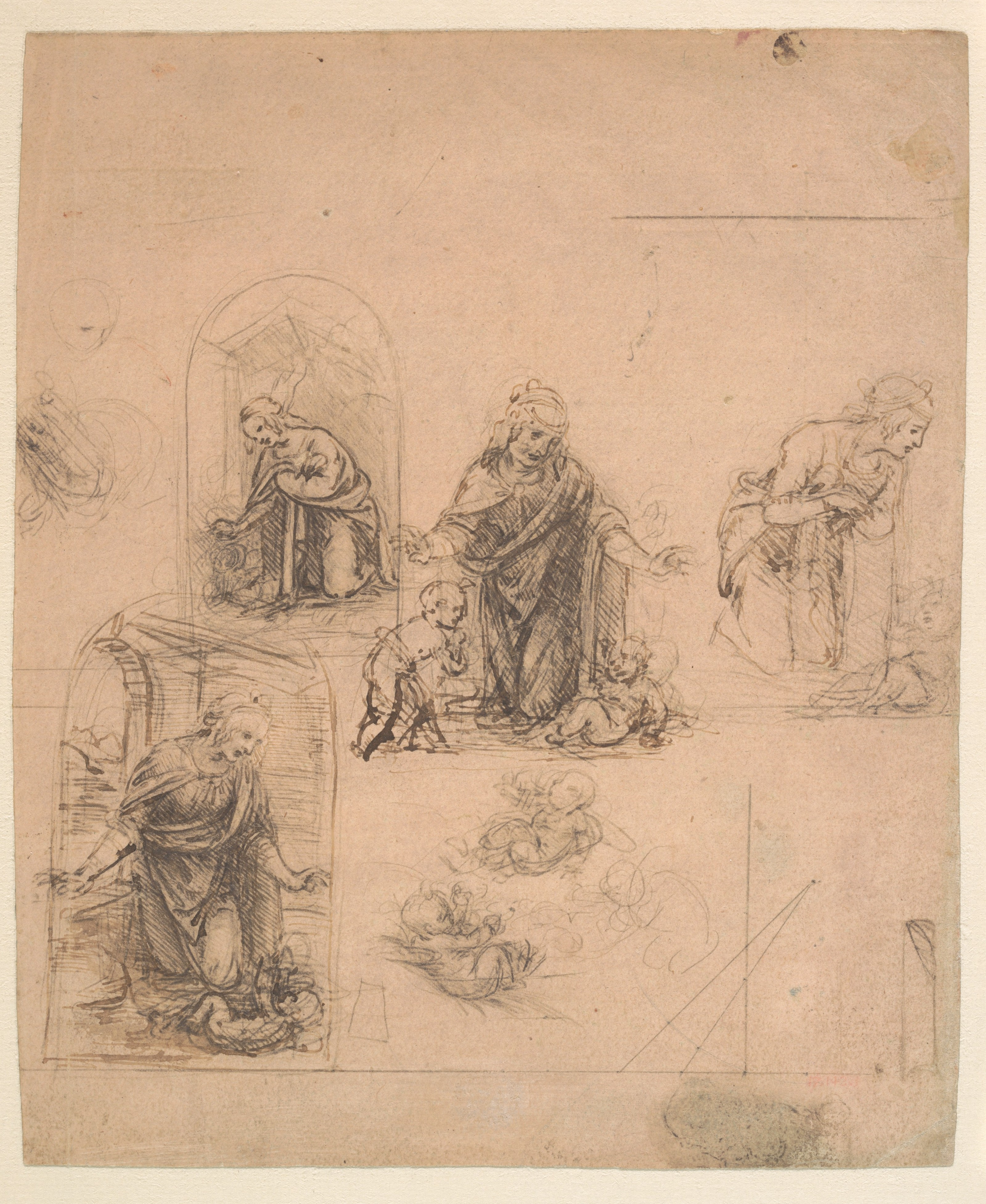
- Year: 1480s
- Dimensions: 19.3 cm (7.6 in) × 16.2 cm (6.4 in)
- Location: Metropolitan Museum of Art
- Accession No.: 17.142.1
- Identifiers: The Met object ID: 337494

Compositional Sketches for the Virgin Adoring the Christ Child, with and without the Infant St. John the Baptist; Diagram of a Perspectival Projection (recto); Slight Doodles (verso) is a 1480s drawing by Leonardo da Vinci. It is in the collection of the Metropolitan Museum of Art.

== Creation ==
Da Vinci used a traditional fifteenth-century medium of metalpoint to make the sketch; however, he reinforced the shadows of the drawings with pen and ink for a deeper tonal range.

== Description and interpretation ==
The sketches depicts the Virgin Mary kneeling before a baby Jesus. As well as baby Jesus alone and perspective experiments.

These sketches contain thematic similarities to his later painting, the Virgin of the Rocks.

== See also ==
- List of works by Leonardo da Vinci
