= List of works by Leonardo da Vinci =

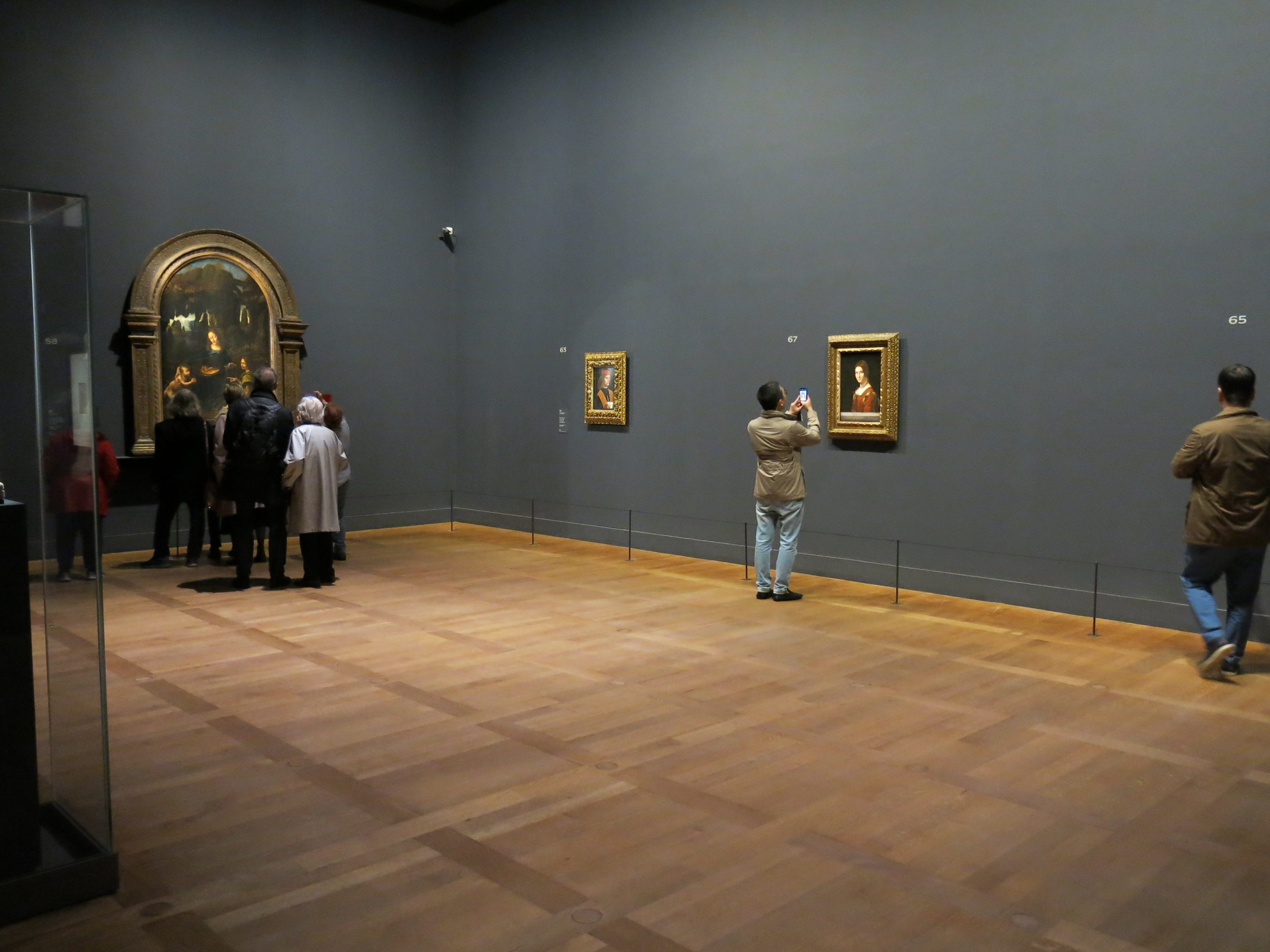
(From left to right) The Louvre Virgin of the Rocks, Portrait of a Musician and La Belle Ferronnière at the Louvre's monumental 2019–2020 exhibition: Léonard de Vinci

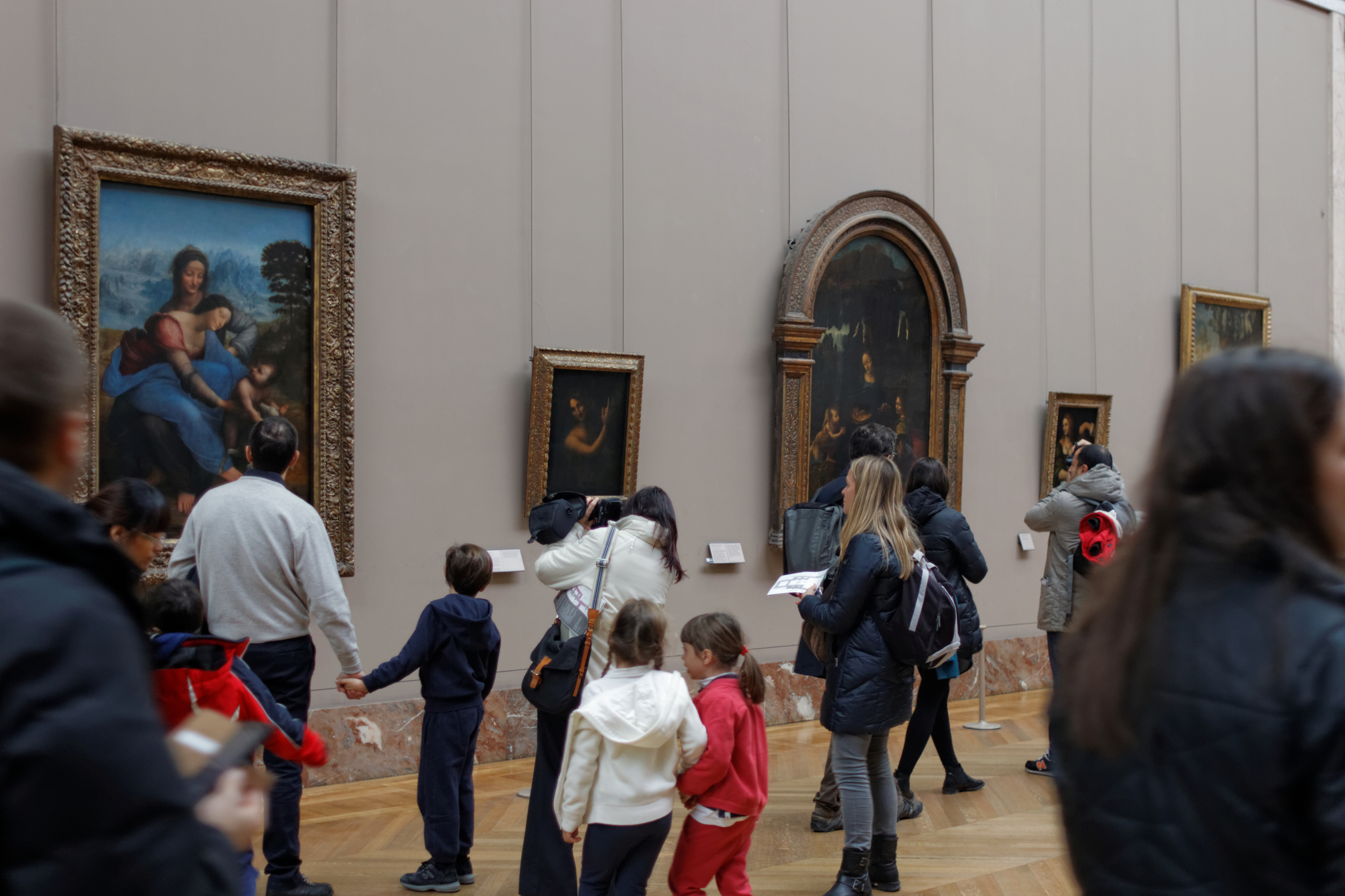
(From left to right) The Virgin and Child with Saint Anne, Saint John the Baptist and Louvre Virgin of the Rocks (Note: Far to the right, partially visible, is Salome with the Head of Saint John the Baptist by Bernardino Luini (a follower of Leonardo) and Bacchus, a disputed painting that is sometimes attributed to Leonardo.)

The Italian polymath Leonardo da Vinci (1452–1519) was one of the founding figures of the High Renaissance, and had an enormous influence on subsequent artists. Eight major works—The Adoration of the Magi, Saint Jerome in the Wilderness, the Louvre Virgin of the Rocks, The Last Supper, the ceiling of the Sala delle Asse, The Virgin and Child with Saint Anne and Saint John the Baptist, The Virgin and Child with Saint Anne, and the Mona Lisa—are universally attributed to him, and have aroused little or no controversy in the past. Eleven additional works are now widely attributed to his oeuvre, though most have previously incited considerable controversy or doubt: the Annunciation, Madonna of the Carnation, The Baptism of Christ (with his teacher, Verrocchio), Ginevra de' Benci, the Benois Madonna, the Portrait of a Musician (with possible studio assistance), the Lady with an Ermine, La Belle Ferronnière, the London Virgin of the Rocks (with studio assistance), the Portrait of Isabella d'Este, and Saint John the Baptist.

Other attributions are more complicated. La Scapigliata appears to be attributed to him by most scholars, but some prominent specialists are silent on the issue. Salvator Mundi's attribution remains extremely controversial, and the extensive nature of the restoration may never allow a definitive resolution. The small number of surviving paintings is due in part to Leonardo's habit of disastrous experimentation with new techniques and his chronic procrastination, resulting in many incomplete works. It is thought that he created many more works that are now lost, though records and copies have survived for some.

In addition to his paintings, there are eleven surviving manuscripts of Leonardo da Vinci's notes and drawings, amounting to thousands of pages in total. There are numerous other works with disputed attributions to Leonardo, which have failed, as of yet, to achieve thorough scholarly approval.

== Major extant works ==
Key: † Collaborative work · ‡ Possibly collaborative work

Universally accepted	Unanimously accepted works
Widely accepted	Accepted by large majority of modern scholars; controversial in the past
Generally accepted	Accepted by most modern scholars; still controversial

Title and image	Date	Medium	Dimensions	Location
The Annunciation	c. 1472–1476 (Note: The Annunciation: Kemp (2019, p. 6): c. 1473–1474; Marani (2003, p. 338): c. 1472–1475; Syson (2011, p. 15): c. 1472–1476; Zöllner (2019, p. 216): c. 1473–1475)	Oil and tempera on poplar panel	98 cm × 217 cm 39 in × 85 in	Uffizi, Florence
	Widely accepted Generally thought to be the earliest extant work by Leonardo. Traditionally attributed to Verrocchio until 1869. It is now almost universally attributed to Leonardo. Attribution proposed by Liphart; accepted by Bode, Lubke, Muller-Walde, Berenson, Clark, Goldscheider and others.			
Madonna of the Carnation	c. 1472–1478 (Note: Madonna of the Carnation: Kemp (2019, p. 15): c. 1475; Marani (2003, p. 338): between 1473 and 1478; Syson (2011, p. 16): c. 1477–1478; Zöllner (2019, p. 214): c. 1472–1478)	Oil on poplar panel	62 cm × 47.5 cm 24.4 in × 18.7 in	Alte Pinakothek, Munich
	Widely accepted Generally accepted as a Leonardo, but has some overpainting possibly by a Flemish artist.			
The Baptism of Christ †	c. 1474–1478 (Note: The Baptism of Christ: Covi (2005, p. 186): c. 1469–1472 by Verrocchio, then resumed by Leonardo perhaps mid-1470s; Kemp (2019, p. 3): Leonardo c. 1474–1476; Marani (2003, p. 338): Leonardo c. 1475–1478; Syson (2011, p. 184): Verrocchio and Leonardo c. 1468–1477; Zöllner (2019, p. 215): Verrocchio c. 1470–1472, Leonardo c. 1475)	Oil and tempera on poplar panel	177 cm × 151 cm 70 in × 59 in	Uffizi, Florence
	Widely accepted as by Verrocchio and Leonardo Painted mainly by Andrea del Verrocchio; Leonardo's contributions include angel on the left-hand side, some of the background landscape and the torso of Christ.			
Ginevra de' Benci	c. 1474–1480 (Note: Ginevra de' Benci: Kemp (2019, p. 17): c. 1478; Marani (2003, p. 338): c. 1474/1475–1476; Syson (2011, p. 48): c. 1474/1478; Zöllner (2019, p. 218): c. 1478–1480)	Oil and tempera on poplar panel	38.8 cm × 36.7 cm 15.3 in × 14.4 in	National Gallery of Art, Washington, D.C.
	Widely accepted While controversial in the past, modern scholarship widely attributes the work to Leonardo. The attribution of Lady with an Ermine supports the attribution of this painting.			
Benois Madonna	c. 1478–1481 (Note: Benois Madonna: Kemp (2019, p. 21): c. 1478–1480; Marani (2003, p. 338): probably after March 1481; Syson (2011, p. 18): c. 1481 onwards; Zöllner (2019, p. 217): c. 1478–1480)	Oil on wood panel, transferred to canvas	49.5 cm × 33 cm 19.5 in × 13.0 in	Hermitage, Saint Petersburg
	Widely accepted			
The Adoration of the Magi (unfinished)	c. 1478–1482 (Note: The Adoration of the Magi: Kemp (2019, p. 27): c. 1481–1482; Marani (2003, p. 338): 1481; Syson (2011, p. 56): c. 1480–1482; Zöllner (2019, p. 222): 1481/1482)	Oil (underpainting) on wood panel	240 cm × 250 cm 94 in × 98 in	Uffizi, Florence
	Universally accepted Forensic and scientific analysis by Maurizio Seracini now proves that at least two layers of varnish, mainly in the lower half of the painting, were applied in the 18th–19th centuries.			
Saint Jerome in the Wilderness (unfinished)	c. 1480–1490 (Note: Saint Jerome in the Wilderness: Kemp (2019, p. 31): c. 1481–1482; Marani (2003, p. 338): probably c. 1480; Syson (2011, p. 139): c. 1488–1490; Zöllner (2019, p. 221): c. 1480–1482)	Tempera and oil on walnut panel	103 cm × 75 cm 41 in × 30 in	Vatican Museums
	Universally accepted			
Madonna Litta †	c. 1481–1495 (Note: Madonna Litta: Kemp (2019, p. 39): c. 1495; Marani (2003): not in checklist; Syson (2011, p. 222): c. 1491–1495; Zöllner (2019, p. 227): c. 1490)	Tempera (and oil) on poplar panel	42 cm × 33 cm 17 in × 13 in	Hermitage, Saint Petersburg
	Widely accepted Martin Kemp claims that the National Gallery, London, exhibited the Madonna Litta on loan from the Hermitage as an autograph work, even though the gallery's own curators believed it to be by a pupil, Giovanni Antonio Boltraffio.			
Virgin of the Rocks (Louvre version)	c. 1483–1493 (Note: Virgin of the Rocks (Louvre version): Kemp (2019, p. 41): c. 1483–1493; Marani (2003, p. 339): between 1483 and 1486; Syson (2011, p. 164): 1483–c. 1485; Zöllner (2019, p. 223): 1483–1484/1485)	Oil on wood panel, transferred to canvas	199 cm × 122 cm 78 in × 48 in	Louvre, Paris
	Universally accepted			
Portrait of a Musician (unfinished) ‡	c. 1483–1487 (Note: Portrait of a Musician: Kemp (2019, p. 47): c. 1483–1486; Marani (2003, p. 339): c. 1485; Syson (2011, p. 95): c. 1486–1487; Zöllner (2019, p. 225): c. 1485)	Oil (and tempera?) on walnut panel	45 cm × 32 cm 18 in × 13 in	Pinacoteca Ambrosiana, Milan
	Widely accepted Widely accepted that Leonardo painted the figure's face. Some scholars suggest the body to be the work of his pupils Giovanni Antonio Boltraffio and Giovanni Ambrogio de Predis			
Lady with an Ermine	c. 1489–1491 (Note: Lady with an Ermine: Kemp (2019, p. 49): c. 1491; Marani (2003, p. 339): 1489–1490; Syson (2011, p. 111): c. 1489–1490; Zöllner (2019, p. 226): 1489/1490)	Oil on walnut panel	54 cm × 39 cm 21 in × 15 in	Czartoryski Museum, Kraków
	Widely accepted While controversial in the past, modern scholarship widely attributes the work to Leonardo. The attribution of Ginevra de' Benci supports the attribution of this painting.			
La Belle Ferronnière	c. 1490–1498 (Note: La Belle Ferronnière: Kemp (2019, p. 57): c. 1498; Marani (2003, p. 339): c. 1490–1495 or 1495–1496; Syson (2011, p. 123): c. 1493–1494; Zöllner (2019, p. 228): c. 1496–1497)	Oil on walnut panel	62 cm × 44 cm 24 in × 17 in	Louvre, Paris
	Widely accepted Modern scholars still debate the attribution and it is not as widely accepted as other portraits like Ginevra de' Benci, Portrait of a Musician, and Lady with an Ermine.			
Virgin of the Rocks (London version) †	c. 1491–1508 (Note: Virgin of the Rocks (London version): Kemp (2019, p. 153): c. 1495–1508; Marani (2003, p. 340): 1491/1494, finished by 1508; Syson (2011, p. 164): c. 1491/1492–1499 and 1506–1508; Zöllner (2019, p. 229): c. 1495–1499 and 1506–1508)	Oil on parqueted poplar panel	189.5 cm × 120 cm 74.6 in × 47.2 in	National Gallery, London
	Generally accepted Generally accepted as postdating the version in the Louvre, and produced in collaboration with Ambrogio de Predis and perhaps others. Some consider it the work of Leonardo's workshop under his direction. The date is not universally agreed.			
The Last Supper	c. 1492–1498 (Note: The Last Supper: Kemp (2019, p. 67): c. 1495–1497; Marani (2003, p. 339): between 1494 and 1498; Syson (2011, p. 252): 1492–1497/1498; Zöllner (2019, p. 230): c. 1495–1498)	Tempera on gesso, pitch and mastic	460 cm × 880 cm 180 in × 350 in	Convent of Santa Maria delle Grazie, Milan
	Universally accepted			
Sala delle Asse	c. 1497–1499 (Note: Sala delle Asse: Kemp (2019, p. 63): c. 1498; Marani (2003, p. 339): c. 1497–1498; Syson (2011, p. 43): c. 1498; Zöllner (2019, p. 233): c. 1498–1499)	Tempera on plaster		Castello Sforzesco, Milan
	Universally accepted			
The Virgin and Child with Saint Anne and Saint John the Baptist	c. 1499–1508 (Note: Virgin and Child with Saint Anne and Saint John the Baptist: Chapman & Faietti (2010, p. 216, fig. 1): c. 1506–1508; Kemp (2019, p. 157): c. 1507–1508; Marani (2003, p. 339): c. 1499–1506; Syson (2011, p. 89): c. 1499–1500; Zöllner (2019, p. 234): 1499–1500 or c. 1508)	Charcoal, black and white chalk on tinted paper, mounted on canvas	142 cm × 105 cm 56 in × 41 in	National Gallery, London
	Universally accepted			
Portrait of Isabella d'Este	c. 1499–1500 (Note: Portrait of Isabella d'Este: Kemp (2019, p. 101): 1500; Marani (2003, p. 339): end of 1499 / early 1500; Syson (2011, p. 44): c. 1499–1500; Zöllner (2019, p. 236): December 1499 – March 1500)	Black and red chalk, yellow pastel chalk on paper	61 cm × 46.5 cm 24.0 in × 18.3 in	Louvre, Paris
	Widely accepted Letters document at least two portrait drawings of Isabella d'Este and, in 1501–1506, her requests to execute the promised portrait in colour.			
Madonna of the Yarnwinder (The Buccleuch Madonna) †	c. 1499–1508 (Note: Madonna of the Yarnwinder (Buccleuch version): Kemp (2019, p. 103): c. 1501–1508; Marani (2003, p. 339): no date given; Syson (2011, p. 294): 1499 onwards; Zöllner (2019, p. 239): c. 1501–1507)	Oil on walnut panel	48.9 cm × 36.8 cm 19.3 in × 14.5 in	Scottish National Gallery, Edinburgh (Note: On long-term loan from the Duke of Buccleuch collection)
	Generally accepted as by Leonardo and another artist (Note: Leonardo da Vinci and an anonymous 16th-century painter Syson (2011, p. 294); Workshop of Leonardo after a design by Leonardo Zöllner (2019, p. 239)) Leonardo was documented as working on a painting of this subject in Florence in 1501; it appears to have been delivered to its patron in 1507. This and the Lansdowne Madonna are the most likely candidates for being that work, but neither is considered to be wholly autograph. Scientific examination has revealed "strikingly complex and similar" underdrawings in both versions, suggesting that Leonardo was involved in the making of both. The use of walnut wood suggests the earlier terminus post quem of 1499, as Leonardo's Milanese paintings are on this support.			
Salvator Mundi ‡	c. 1499–1510 (Note: Salvator Mundi: Kemp (2019, p. 149): c. 1504–1510; Marani (2003): not in checklist; lost at the time of publication.; Syson (2011, p. 300): c. 1499 onwards; Zöllner (2019, p. 250): c. 1507 onwards)	Oil on wood panel	65.6 cm × 45.4 cm 25.8 in × 17.9 in	Unknown
	Generally accepted Previously presumed to be a later copy of the lost original painting. Purchased in 2005 and restored, it has gained only few acceptance as Leonardo's original. Pentimenti (changes to the composition) were found in the thumb of Christ's right hand and elsewhere which are indicators of the painting's status as an "original". The painting set a new record for sale price (US$450 million) when auctioned by Christie's in 2017. Matthew Landrus considers it to be primarily the work of Bernardino Luini. In the 2021 documentary The Lost Leonardo, Frank Zöllner said: "You have the old parts of the painting which are original—these are by pupils—and the new parts of the painting, which look like Leonardo, but they are by the restorer. In some part, it's a masterpiece by Dianne Modestini". In 2021, the Spanish Prado downgraded the painting to a partial attribution. In 2022, the Encyclopædia Britannica noted: "no official record of the painting's attribution officially exists".			
Madonna of the Yarnwinder (The Lansdowne Madonna) †	c. 1501–1508 (Note: Madonna of the Yarnwinder (Lansdowne version): Kemp (2019, p. 103): c. 1501–1508; Marani (2003, p. 339): no date given; Syson (2011): no date given; Zöllner (2019, p. 238): c. 1501–1507)	Oil on wood panel (transferred to canvas and later re-laid on panel)	50.2 cm × 36.4 cm 19.8 in × 14.3 in	Collection of Kenneth C. Griffin, New York City. On loan to Metropolitan Museum of Art as of March 2026
	Generally accepted as having an underdrawing by Leonardo (Note: Salaì after a design by Leonardo Zöllner (2019, p. 238))			
The Virgin and Child with Saint Anne	c. 1501–1519 (Note: Virgin and Child with Saint Anne: Kemp (2019, p. 161): c. 1508–1516; Marani (2003, p. 340): c. 1510–1513; Syson (2011, p. 70): c. 1501 onwards; Zöllner (2019, p. 244): c. 1503–1519)	Oil on wood panel	168 cm × 112 cm 66 in × 44 in	Louvre, Paris
	Universally accepted			
Mona Lisa (unfinished)	c. 1502–1516 (Note: Mona Lisa: Kemp (2019, p. 127): c. 1503–1515; Marani (2003, p. 340): c. 1503–1504; 1513–1514; Syson (2011, p. 48): c. 1502 onwards; Zöllner (2019, p. 240): c. 1503–1506; 1510)	Oil on cottonwood (poplar) panel	76.8 cm × 53 cm 30.2 in × 20.9 in	Louvre, Paris
	Universally accepted A drawing by Giovanni Ambrogio Figino depicting an elderly Leonardo with his right arm assuaged by cloth (Note: Identified via its similarity to Leonardo's presumed self-portrait) and a record of an October 1517 visit by Louis d'Aragon, (Note: "On the 10th of October, 1517, Monsignor and the rest of us went to see, in one of the outlying parts of Amboise, Messer Lunardo Vinci the Florentine, an old graybeard of more than 70 years, the most excellent painter of our time, who showed His Excellency three pictures [...] all most perfect, and from whom, since he was then subject to a certain paralysis of the right hand, one could not expect any more good work") confirm an account of Leonardo's right hand being paralytic at the age of 65, which may indicate why he left works such as the Mona Lisa unfinished.			
La Scapigliata (unfinished)	c. 1506–1508 (Note: La Scapigliata: Kemp (2019): Not listed; Marani (2003, p. 340): c. 1508; Syson (2011, p. 198): no date given; Zöllner (2019): not in checklist)	Earth, amber and white lead on wood panel	24.7 cm × 21 cm 9.7 in × 8.3 in	Galleria Nazionale, Parma
	Generally accepted (Note: Follower of Leonardo Syson (2011, p. 198, n. 9); "ascribed today to Leonardo" Marani (2003, p. 140))			
Saint John the Baptist	c. 1507–1516 (Note: Saint John the Baptist: Kemp (2019, p. 189): c. 1507–1514; Marani (2003, p. 340): c. 1508; Syson (2011, p. 63): c. 1500 onwards; Zöllner (2019, p. 248): c. 1508–1516)	Oil on walnut panel	69 cm × 57 cm 27 in × 22 in	Louvre, Paris
	Widely accepted While controversial in the past, modern scholarship widely attributes the work to Leonardo. Scientific evidence in the second half of the 20th century has furthered this attribution.			

== Manuscripts ==
Title and sample image	Dates	Abbreviation(s)	Pages	Location
Codex Atlanticus	1478–1519	C.A.	1,119	Pinacoteca Ambrosiana, Milan
Giant crossbow (C.A.149b-r/53v-b)	12 volumes, collated by the sculptor Pompeo Leoni.			
Codex Windsor	1478–1518	W.	153	Royal Collection, Windsor
Fetus in the womb (W.19102r)	These drawings were pasted into an album by Pompeo Leoni, probably entered the English royal collection in the reign of Charles II, and were removed from their binding in the 19th century.			
Codex Arundel	1480–1518	B.L., Arundel MS. or Br.M.	283	British Library, London
Diving apparatus (B.L.24v)				
Codex Trivulzianus	c. 1487–1490	Triv.	55 (originally 62)	Biblioteca Trivulziana, Castello Sforzesco, Milan
List with a profile portrait (Triv.30r)				
Codex Forster	1487–1505	Forster I, II and III (including I^{1}, I^{2} and II^{2}); formerly known as S.K.M.I, II and III	354	Victoria and Albert Museum, London
Determining the volume of regular and irregular solids (Forster I.7r)	Five pocket notebooks bound into three volumes, here listed in chronological order: I^{2} (Milan, c. 1487–1490): Discusses hydraulic engineering, the moving and raising of water and perpetual motion. III (Milan, c. 1490–1493): Notes on geometry, weights and hydraulics interspersed with sketches of horses' legs, what might be designs for ball costumes and a description of the anatomy of the human head. II^{1} (Milan, c. 1495): Notes on the theory of proportions and other miscellaneous material. II^{2} (Milan, 1495–1497): Notes on the theory of weights, traction, stresses and balances. I^{1} (Florence, 1505): Notes on the measurement of solid bodies and on topology.			
Paris Manuscripts	1488–1505	A, B, C, D, E, F, G, H (including H^{1}, H^{2} and H^{3}), I (including I^{1} and I^{2}), K (including K^{1}, K^{2} and K^{3}), L and M	more than 2,500	Bibliothèque de l'Institut de France, Paris
Aerial screw (detail of B.83v) Vertically standing bird's-winged flying machine (B.80r)	12 volumes, here listed in chronological order: B (1488–1490; 84 folios): Notebook including designs for flying machines (including the "helicopter"), a submarine, centrally-planned churches and war machines. C (1490–91; 28 folios. One section missing.) Treatise on light and shade; also discusses the flow of water and percussion. A (c. 1492): Fragment of a larger MS which included the Codex Ashburnham II. Subjects covered include painting, perspective, water and mechanics. H (1493–94; 142 folios): Three pocket notebooks bound together. Discusses Euclidean geometry and the design of drawing materials. M (late 1490s–1500; 48 folios): A pocket notebook on geometry, ballistics and botany. L (1497–1502; 94 folios): A notebook on military engineering, used by Leonardo when he was in the employ of Cesare Borgia. K (1503–1508; 128 folios): Three pocket notebooks, mainly on geometry. I (1497–1505; 139 folios): Two pocket notebooks with notes on geometry, architecture, Latin, perspective and proportions for painters. D (1508–09; 10 folios with 20 drawings): Discusses theories of vision. F (1508–1513; 96 folios): Discusses water, optics, geology and astronomy. E (1513–14; originally 96 folios): Discusses weights and the effects of gravity, an invention for draining the Pontine Marshes, geometry, painting and the flight of birds. G (1510–1515; 93 folios): Primarily discusses botany.			
Codex Madrid	1490s–1504	Madrid I and Madrid II		Biblioteca Nacional de España, Madrid
Drawing of the ironwork casting mould for the head of the Sforza Horse (Madrid II.156v–157r)	Two volumes, rediscovered in 1966: I (1490s): Mainly concerned with the science of mechanisms. II (1503–04): Miscellaneous drawings, including maps of the Arno relating to the project to divert its course and notes and drawings relating to the casting of the Sforza monument.			
Codex Ashburnham	c. 1492	Ash.I. or B.N.2037 (formerly part of MS.B.); Ash.II or B.N.2038 (formerly part of MS.A.)		Bibliothèque de l'Institut de France, Paris
Studies for a building on a centralized plan (Ash.I.5v)	Two volumes, taken out of Paris Manuscripts A and B and sold to the Earl of Ashburnham, who returned them to Paris in 1890.			
Codex on the Flight of Birds	dated 1505	Turin	18	Biblioteca Reale, Turin
Notes on the position of a bird in flight in relationship to the wind (Turin.8r)	Originally part of Paris Manuscript B; probably stolen by Count Guglielmo Libri in around 1840–1847.			
Codex Leicester	1506–1510	Leic.	72	Collection of Bill Gates, Seattle (tours internationally)
Studies of the illumination of the moon (Leic.1A (1r))				
Codex Urbinas and libro A	c. 1530	Urb. and L°A.		Biblioteca Apostolica Vaticana
	An anthology of writings by Leonardo compiled after his death by his pupil Francesco Melzi. An abridged version was published in 1651 as a treatise on painting (Trattato della Pittura).			

== Lost works ==
Title, and image of derivative work	Date	Type	Last known location
Adam and Eve (unfinished)	c. mid 1460s – early 1470s	Watercolor cartoon for a tapestry	In the collection of Ottaviano de' Medici during Vasari's lifetime (1511–1574)
Drawing by Francesco di Giorgio Martini, possibly based on Leonardo's cartoon	Described in great detail by Giorgio Vasari and the Anonimo Gaddiano. Painted for the King of Portugal, it was in the collection of Ottaviano de' Medici in Vasari's lifetime. The composition might have inspired a drawing by Francesco di Giorgio Martini in the Christ Church Picture Gallery, Oxford.		
Dragon shield	c. 1472	Painted shield	Unknown
	A juvenile work known only from accounts by Giorgio Vasari and the Anonimo Gaddiano. Vasari stated that it was sold by Leonardo's father Ser Piero da Vinci to merchants, who then sold it on to the Duke of Milan.		
The Head of Medusa	Youthful work	Oil on panel	In the collection of Cosimo I de' Medici during Vasari's lifetime (1511–1574)
	A juvenile work only known from an account by Giorgio Vasari. A Flemish painting of this subject of c. 1600 in the Uffizi, Florence, was once mistakenly thought to be this work.		
San Bernardo Altarpiece (unfinished)	Commissioned 10 January 1478	Oil on panel	Unknown
	A commission for the chapel in the Palazzo della Signoria, Florence, allocated to Leonardo on 10 January 1478 but never completed. The commission had originally been given to Piero del Pollaiuolo on 24 December 1477; its reallocation might have been arranged by Leonardo's father, who was a notary to the Signoria. After Leonardo's failure to fulfill the commission it was given to Domenico Ghirlandaio on 20 May 1483, but he did not complete the work either. It is sometimes mistakenly said that a Virgin and Child with Saints in the Uffizi by Filippino Lippi was the work finally delivered to the chapel, but this was painted for the Sala dei Dugento (council hall) of the palace.		
The Battle of Anghiari	Commissioned 4 May 1504	Mural painting	Still visible in 1549
Copy by Peter Paul Rubens	Covered up by frescoes by Vasari, beginning in 1563. The remains of Leonardo's fresco may have been discovered in the Salone dei Cinquecento.		
Leda and the Swan	c. 1504–1508	Oil painting	Recorded by Cassiano dal Pozzo as being at the Palace of Fontainebleau in 1625.
Copy by Cesare da Sesto	There are nine known copies of the painting, including: Cesare da Sesto, Leda and the Swan (pictured). Oil on wood, 69.5 cm × 73.7 cm (27.4 in × 29.0 in). Wilton House, Wiltshire; Anonymous, possibly Il Sodoma, Leda and the Swan. Tempera on wood, 115 cm × 86 cm (45 in × 34 in). Galleria Borghese, Rome; Francesco Melzi, Leda and the Swan. Uffizi, Florence; Anonymous, possibly Fernando Yáñez de la Almedina, Leda and the Swan. Oil on panel, 131.1 cm × 76.2 cm (51.6 in × 30.0 in). Philadelphia Museum of Art (previously at John G. Johnson Collection, 1917); Giampietrino, Leda and the Swan, from the collection of the Marquess of Hastings; Giampietrino, Venus and Cupid, private collection, Milan; Venus and Cupid, 16th century, Oil on panel, New Orleans Museum of Art		
Angel of the Annunciation	c. 1510–1513	Oil painting	In Duke Cosimo I de' Medici's palace during Vasari's lifetime (1511–1574)
The Incarnate Angel, satirical copy	The painting is described by Vasari. A drawing survives among studies for the Battle of Anghiari (see below). The drawing at left, known as The Incarnate Angel, is a satirical copy, by Leonardo. There are some extant copies of the subject by Leonardeschi, including: Workshop of Leonardo da Vinci? Angel of the Annunciation, c. 1505 – 1513? Oil on canvas (transferred from panel), 66 cm × 47.3 cm (26.0 in × 18.6 in), Hermitage, Saint Petersburg.; Workshop of Leonardo da Vinci? Saint John the Baptist, c. 1508 – 1513? Panel, 71 cm × 52 cm (28 in × 20 in), Kunstmuseum Basel.; Workshop of Leonardo da Vinci? Saint John the Baptist, c. 1508 – 1513? Oil on panel, 75 cm × 53.4 cm (29.5 in × 21.0 in), Ashmolean Museum, Oxford.; Baccio Bandinelli. Annunciate Angel. Sketch after Leonardo da Vinci.		

== Disputed works ==
Key: Supposedly collaborative work

Title and image	Date	Medium	Dimensions	Location
Madonna and Child with a Pomegranate (The Dreyfus Madonna)	probably c. 1469	Oil on wood	15.7 cm × 12.8 cm 6.2 in × 5.0 in	National Gallery of Art, Washington, D.C.
	Previously attributed to Verrocchio or Lorenzo di Credi. Most critics have considered the anatomy of the Christ Child to be so poor as to discourage firm attribution to Leonardo, but some believe that it is a work of his youth. This attribution was made by Suida in 1929. Other art historians such as Shearman and Morelli attribute the work to Verrocchio. Daniel Arasse discusses this painting as a youthful work by Leonardo in his monograph of 1997.			
Tobias and the Angel †	c. 1473	Egg tempera on poplar	83.6 cm × 66 cm 32.9 in × 26.0 in	National Gallery, London
	Workshop of Verrocchio, with a possible contribution by Leonardo (Note: Kemp (2004, p. 247)) Martin Kemp suggests that Leonardo may have painted some part of this work, most likely the fish. David Alan Brown, of the National Gallery in Washington, attributes the painting of the dog to him as well.			
The Holy Infants Embracing	c. 1486–1490			
	Several versions in private collections.			
Portrait of a Lady in Profile	c. 1493–1495	Tempera and oil on panel	51 cm × 34 cm 20 in × 13 in	Pinacoteca Ambrosiana, Milan
	Generally attributed to Ambrogio de Predis. According to Martin Kemp, Leonardo may have been responsible for "laying down the basis of the image", based on "[t]he quality of drawing in the head". (Note: Kemp 2004, p. 251; attributed there to "[Leonardo,] probably with his studio", but this work does not appear in a later edition (Kemp 2011).)			
La Bella Principessa	1495–1496 (Kemp)	Bodycolour (pastel) on vellum	33 cm × 22 cm 13.0 in × 8.7 in	Private collection, Switzerland
	Identified as a Leonardo by Martin Kemp on stylistic grounds, and confirmed using the evidence of a fingerprint. Other experts have not agreed with this attribution. As of 2010 the methods used to analyse the fingerprint have come into question. The presence of holes in the page shows that it was once part of the Sforziada, a manuscript kept in Warsaw; this fact points to its originality.			
Virgin of the Rocks Chéramy †	c. 1495–1497 (Pedretti)	Oil on wood panel, transferred to canvas	154.5 cm × 122 cm 60.8 in × 48.0 in	Private collection, Switzerland
	Attributed to Leonardo and his workshop by Carlo Pedretti; believed by others to be a copy of the Virgin of the Rocks by Leonardo's student Giampietrino. Mentioned by Jean-Auguste-Dominique Ingres in 1845 and by Pierre Puvis de Chavannes; both were convinced that it was an original work by Leonardo.			
Madonna and Child with St Joseph or Adoration of the Christ Child	between 1495 and 1500	Tempera on panel	Diam. 87 cm (34 in)	Galleria Borghese, Rome
Young Christ	c. 1496	Terracotta		Private collection
	The bust is said by Kemp to be the most likely candidate for a surviving sculpture by Leonardo. (Note: Kemp 2004, p. 252; described there as "probably by Leonardo")			
Portrait of Luca Pacioli †	c. 1495–1500	Tempera on panel	99 cm × 120 cm 39 in × 47 in	Museo di Capodimonte, Naples
	The painting has been generally attributed to Jacopo de' Barbari due to the presence of a cartouche with a cryptic inscription resembling his name, but some attribute the painting (at least partially) to Leonardo, who began collaborating with Pacioli when the latter moved to Milan in 1496. Leonardo illustrated Archimedean solids, including the rhombicuboctahedron (pictured in the portrait), in Pacioli's Divina proportione (1509). According to one scholar, in the rhombicuboctahedron "we surely see the ineffable left hand of Leonardo da Vinci, who drew the superb pictures for De divina proportione, which, moreover, hang from a string ..."			
Christ Carrying the Cross †	c. 1500	Oil on poplar		Private collection, San Francisco
	Previously attributed by Sotheby's to Gian Francesco Maineri. Attributed to Leonardo by its former owner. Attribution based on the similarity of the tormentors of Christ to drawings made by Rubens of the Battle of Anghiari. According to Forbes magazine, Carlo Pedretti said that he knew of three similar paintings and "[a]ll four paintings, he believed, were likely the work of Leonardo's studio assistants and perhaps even the master himself."			
Isleworth Mona Lisa †		Oil on canvas	84.5 cm × 64.5 cm 33.3 in × 25.4 in	Private collection, Switzerland
	Its proponents claim that this is the earlier of two versions of the Mona Lisa, painted for Francesco del Giocondo (husband of Lisa) in 1503, and that the Louvre version was painted for Giuliano de' Medici in 1517.			
Horse and Rider	c. 1506–1508 (Pedretti 1985) c. 1506–1510 (Kemp 1992) c. 1508–1511 (Solari 2016)	Beeswax		Private collection, London
	Fragmentary wax statuette in a private collection in London, formerly in the Sangiorgi Collection in Rome; said to have come from the Melzi estate at Vaprio d'Adda. Carlo Pedretti in 1985 considered it to be an autograph work by Leonardo, and Martin Kemp, after personally examining the wax model wrote in 1992, "My overall conclusion is that I would not eliminate an attribution to Leonardo." However, in 2019 Kemp told Bloomberg, "It seems to me not credible as a Leonardo sculpture", noting that it had none of the characteristics of understanding of horse anatomy or armor that could be expected of a da Vinci work. The attribution has been criticized by various other art historians and publications, citing a lack of hard evidence or documentation.			
Lucan portrait of Leonardo da Vinci	c. 1505–1510	Tempera grassa on poplar	40 cm × 60 cm 16 in × 24 in	Museo delle Antiche Genti di Lucania, Vaglio Basilicata
	A painting discovered in 2008 near Naples, which closely resembles the Uffizi's 17th-century copy of the "Self-portrait of Leonardo da Vinci", is currently undergoing restoration and investigation. A date in the late 15th or 16th centuries has been confirmed by scientific testing. Fingerprints match those found on the Lady with an Ermine. Alternatively attributed to Cristofano dell'Altissimo.			
Portrait of a Man in Red Chalk	c. 1512	Red chalk on paper	33.3 cm × 21.6 cm 13.1 in × 8.5 in	Biblioteca Reale, Turin
	Accepted by some scholars, but not universally accepted.			
Bacchus	c. 1513–1516 c. 1510–1515, later repainted and altered	Oil on walnut panel transferred to canvas	177 cm × 115 cm 70 in × 45 in	Louvre, Paris
	Disputed Generally considered to be a workshop copy of a drawing. According to Kemp, it may have been begun by Leonardo as a figure of John the Baptist.			
Mary Magdalene	1515		58 cm × 45 cm 23 in × 18 in	Private collection, Switzerland
	Described as a potential Leonardo by Carlo Pedretti. Previously attributed to Giampietrino, who painted a number of similar Magdalenes. Pedretti's attribution is not accepted by other scholars, e.g. Carlo Bertelli (former director of the Pinacoteca di Brera in Milan), who said that the subject could be a Lucretia with the knife removed.			

== See also ==
- Portraits of Leonardo da Vinci
- The Virgin and Child with Saint Anne (cartoon)

== Sources ==
- Ames-Lewis, Francis (2012). Isabella and Leonardo: The Artistic Relationship between Isabella d'Este and Leonardo da Vinci, 1500–1506. New Haven, Connecticut: Yale University Press. ISBN 978-0-300-12124-7.
- Bambach, Carmen C., ed. (2003). Leonardo da Vinci: Master Draftsman. New Haven, Connecticut: Yale University Press. ISBN 978-1588390332.
- Chapman, Hugo; Faietti, Marzia (2010). Fra Angelico to Leonardo: Italian Renaissance Drawings. London, England: British Museum Press. ISBN 978-0-7141-2667-8.
- Ottino della Chiesa, Angela (1967). The Complete Paintings of Leonardo da Vinci. Penguin Classics of World Art. London, UK: Penguin Books. ISBN 978-0-14-008649-2.
- Clayton, Martin (2006). Ten Drawings by Leonardo da Vinci: An Exhibition to Celebrate the Eightieth Birthday of Her Majesty The Queen. Royal Collection Publications. ISBN 9-781902-163017.
- Covi, Dario A. (2005). Andrea del Verrocchio: Life and Work. Arte e archeologia: Studi e documenti. Florence, Italy: Leo S. Olschki Editore. ISBN 978-8822254207.
- Delieuvin, Vincent, ed. (2012). Saint Anne: Leonardo da Vinci's Ultimate Masterpiece. Milan, Italy: Officina Libraria. ISBN 978-8897737025.
- Kemp, Martin (2004). Leonardo. Oxford, England: Oxford University Press. ISBN 9-780192-806444.
- ——— (2007). Leonardo da Vinci: The Marvellous Works of Nature and Man. Oxford, England: Oxford University Press. ISBN 978-0-19-920778-7.
- ——— (2011). Leonardo: Revised edition. Oxford, England: Oxford University Press. ISBN 978-0199583355.
- ——— (2019). Leonardo da Vinci: The 100 Milestones. New York City, New York: Sterling. ISBN 978-1454930426.
- Marani, Pietro C. (2003). Leonardo da Vinci: The Complete Paintings. New York, New York: Harry N. Abrams, Inc. ISBN 978-0810991590.
- Pedretti, Carlo (1987). Leonardo Da Vinci: Drawings of Horses and Other Animals from the Royal Library at Windsor Castle. New York, New York: Johnson Reprint Corp. ISBN 978-0384452824.
- ——— , ed. (1988). Achademia Leonardi Vinci: Journal of Leonardo Studies & Bibliography of Vinciana Vol. I–X. Villa La Loggia, Florence: Guinti. ISBN 978-0815001034.
- ——— (2006). Leonardo: Art and Science. Surrey, England: Taj Books International. ISBN 978-1844060368.
- Pedretti, Carlo; Taglialagamba, Sara (2017). Leonardo da Vinci: the "Virgin of the rocks" in the Cheramy version: its history & critical fortune. Poggio a Caiano, Italy: CB edizioni. ISBN 978-8897644538.
- Rubin, Patricia Lee; Wright, Alison (1999). Renaissance Florence: The Art of the 1470s. London, England: National Gallery Publications. ISBN 978-1857092660.
- Shearman, John (1992). Only Connect: Art and the Spectator in the Italian Renaissance. Oxford, England: Oxford University Press. ISBN 978-0691655413.
- Solari, Ernesto (2016). Leonardo da Vinci Horse and Rider Il "Monumento" a Charles d'Amboise. Milan: Colibri Edizioni. ISBN 978-88-97206-33-0.
- Syson, Luke; Keith, Larry; Galansino, Arturo; Mazzotta, Antonio; Nethersole, Scott; Rumberg, Per (2011). Leonardo da Vinci: Painter at the Court of Milan (1st ed.). London, England: National Gallery. ISBN 978-1857094916.
- Zöllner, Frank (2019). Leonardo da Vinci: The Complete Paintings and Drawings (Anniversary ed.). Cologne, Germany: Taschen.
