= Sala delle Asse =

Room decorated by Leonardo da Vinci in the Castello Sforzesco, Milan

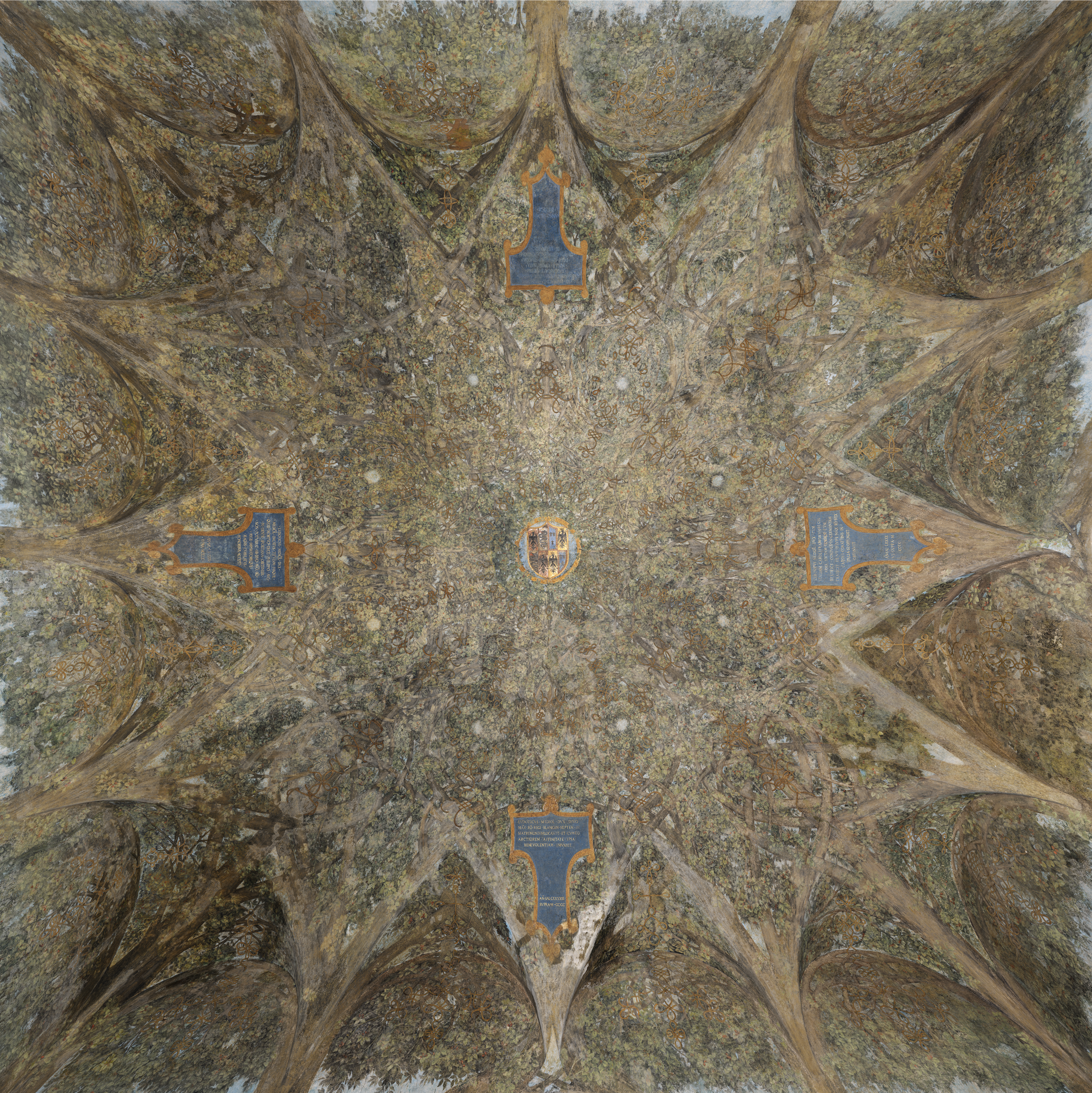
The vault of the Sala delle Asse after the 1950s restoration

The Sala delle Asse (In English: 'room of the wooden planks'), is a large room in the Castello Sforzesco in Milan, the location of a painting in tempera on plaster by Leonardo da Vinci, dating from about 1498. Its walls and vaulted ceiling are decorated with "intertwining plants with fruits and monochromes of roots and rocks" and a canopy created by sixteen trees.

The walls and ceiling are painted with a trompe-l'œil scheme depicting trunks, leaves, fruits, and knots, as if it was in the open air and not within a castle. Art historian Rocky Ruggiero describes the decoration of the square, fifteen-by-fifteen-meters room as creating the effect of a natural pergola as an architectural feature. Ruggiero suggests that Leonardo drew upon all of his scientific research into natural systems as he painted the masterful illusion that resembles a grove of mulberry trees.

== History ==
The room was decorated in 1498, as testified by a letter to the Duke of Milan, Ludovico Sforza, nicknamed “il Moro” ("the moor”), that is dated 21 April 1498. In the letter Gualtiero Bascapè, the duke's chancellor, states “…Magistro Leonardo promises to finish it by September”. On the 23rd, he wrote that “the large chamber is free from the boards”.

The current name of the room is incongruous. Some experts state that the name was used prior to the painting by Leonardo. The walls had been covered with wooden planks (in Italian, “asse” means planks), and hence, the hall of the planks had been the name traditionally used to identify the room. Other experts say that this name was a misreading of the letter; with his words, the chancellor was stating a fact (the getting rid of the planks), not giving the name of the room.

Immediately after this letter, in 1499, Milan was taken over by the French army led by king Louis XII, and Ludovico Sforza fled. Over the centuries, several foreign dominations (Spanish, Austrians, and others) followed. The Sforza Castle was used for military purposes: the walls of the room were painted over in white and memory of the painting was lost.

When Italy was unified (1861) the castle was in full decay and people discussed tearing it down. Toward the end of the nineteenth century, architect Luca Beltrami implemented a plan for restoring the castle, as it can be seen today. Within the restoration, in 1893, some traces of the original paint were detected below the white surface covering the room. Beltrami found the proper financing (mostly from private sources) and selected Ernesto Rusca for a restoration of Sala delle Asse.

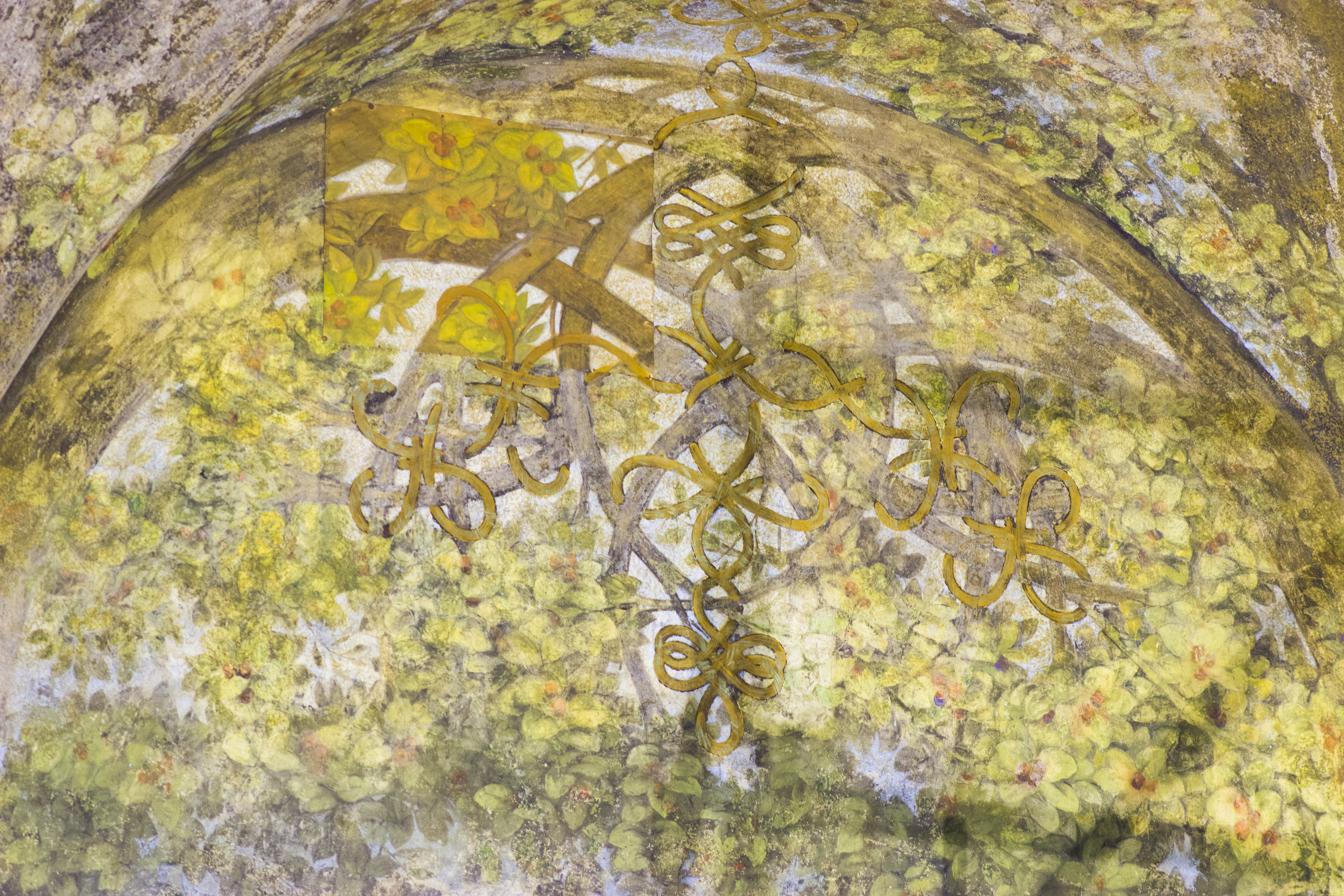
Remains of the 1902 restoration (compare to the 1950s restoration that diminished colors)

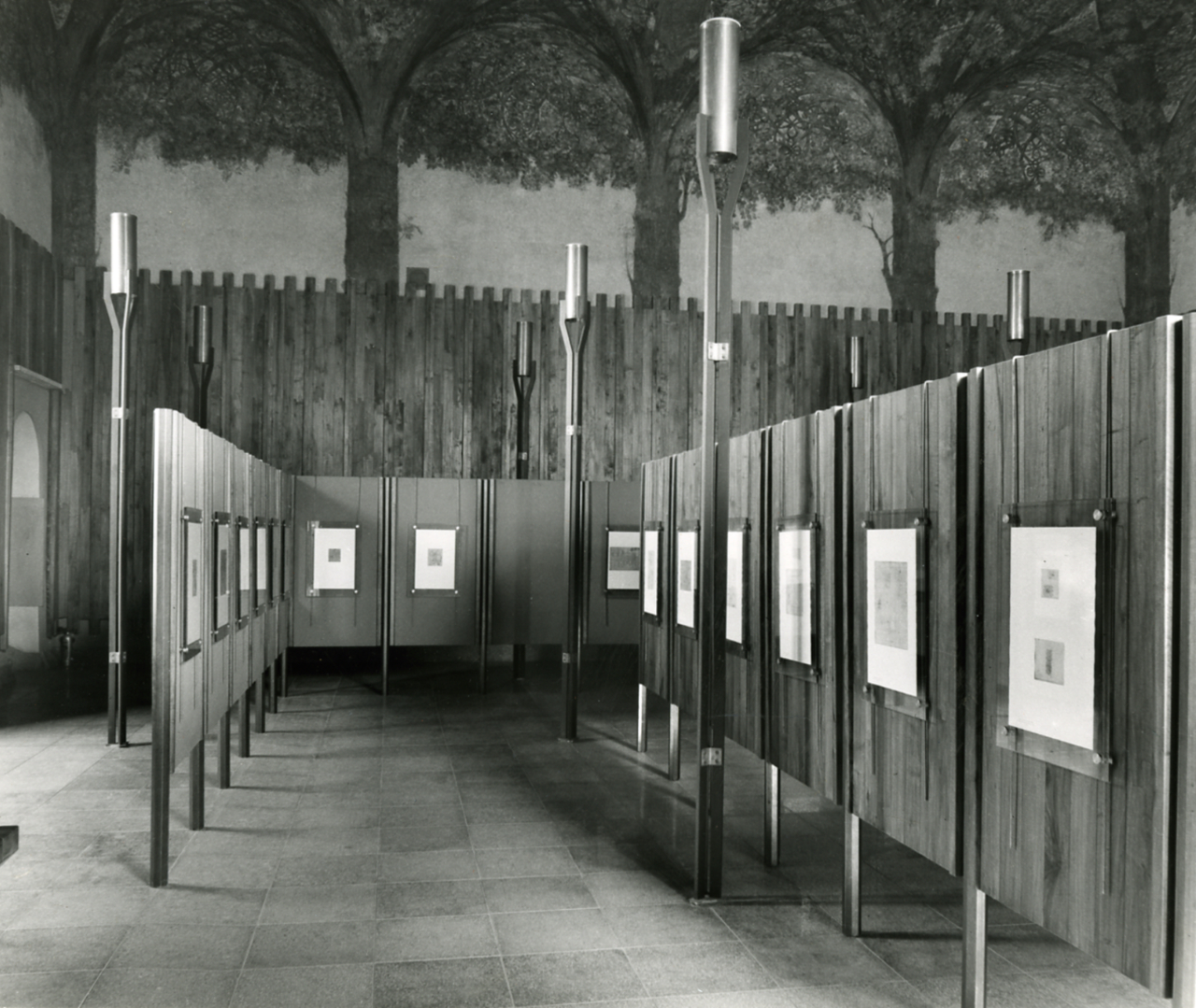
Wall panelling, exhibition displays and lighting in 1956 (photo: Paolo Monti)

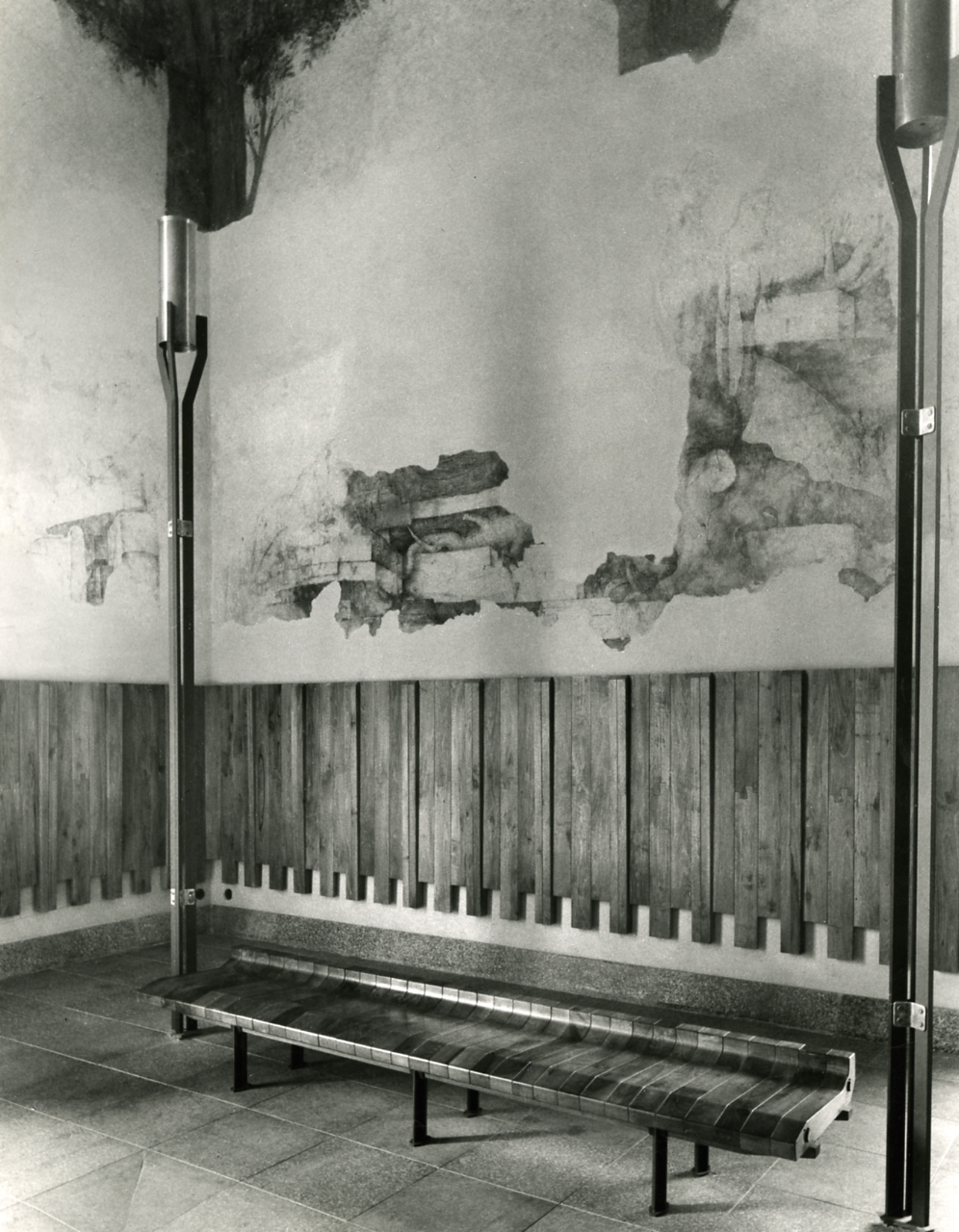
Lower panelling to show preliminary drawings in 1956 (photo: Paolo Monti)

In 1902, visitors could see the result of this restoration: a wonderful depiction of trunks on the walls and a canopy of branches and leaves on the ceiling. Colors were bright. Immediately critics noted that the “style” did not resemble what they thought was Leonardo's "typical" style of painting. In addition, the lack of photographic documentation of the room's situation during the restoration raised suspicions.

In the 1950s, partially to appease the critics, a second restoration was conducted by Ottemi della Rotta and executed by the restorer Ernesto Rusca. Basically, colors were toned down and the room took a more “antique” flavor, which can still be seen. Experts of the scientific committee still have conflicting opinions about this subject. On the lateral walls new wooden panels were installed covering the preparatory drawings, while benches for visitors in part hid the drawings at the bottom.

In 2012, a third restoration project was launched. The main goal was to block deterioration by humidity and other factors. The scientific goal was to investigate the decoration further, uncovering as much as possible of the original work by Leonardo.

This restoration was ongoing in December 2018 and some important results already had been achieved, including the recovery of more preliminary drawings (called “monochrome”) on the lower parts of the walls.

== The decoration of Sala delle Asse ==
Pietro Marani, member of the scientific committee for the current restoration, said about the room: “one is amazed by its spectacular vaulted ceiling, decorated with branches and knots all tangled together: a long rope, weaving together all these branches, is entwined with vegetal elements…”.

Of the first restoration performed at the beginning of the twentieth century, traces can still be seen in a few spots on the vault. The restoration left the room fully decorated in the vault, with strong trunks on the lateral walls, interrupted by wooden panels. The bright colors puzzled many leading experts of the time, who were used to the fading colors of the Last Supper.

Therefore much more somber colors were the result of the second restoration in the 1950s, when the bright colors of the first restoration did not seem to fit the muted tone range, which at the time was thought to be Leonardo's style.

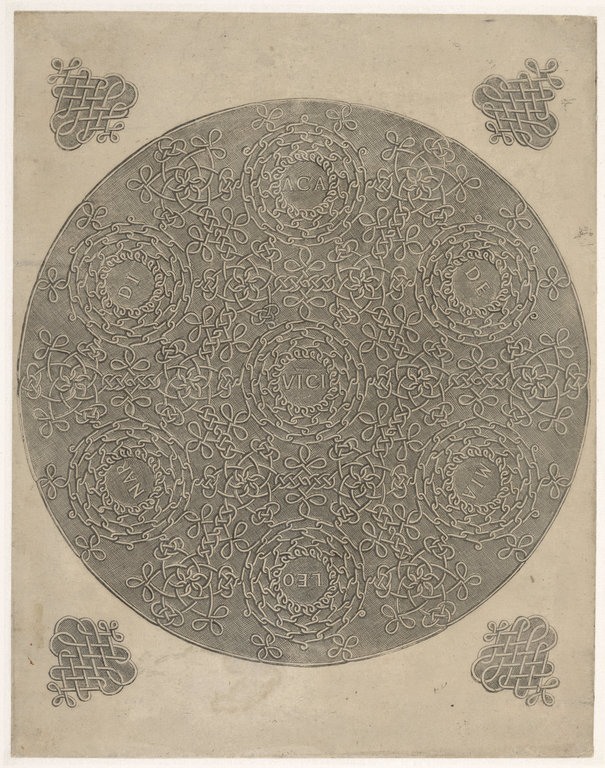
One of the Academia tracings by Leonardo (Louvre, Paris)

The branches, leaves, and berries of eighteen mulberry trees make up the decoration. The branches follow the rips of the vault hiding its architectural construction. The branches and the leaves create the illusion of one being in open space under a canopy of leaves, not in a room of the castle. Symmetrical golden ropes and knots are interwoven with the branches, combining in a unique way the natural growth of plants with abstract geometrical tracing. According to Francesca Tasso, vice president of the scientific committee, “ropes twisting into knots, some of which are extremely complex, constitute a recurring theme in Leonardo da Vinci's work, during the two decades he spent in Milan”.

The Sala delle Asse is an expression of a leader's palace conceived as "paradise", an idea well established in the mid-15th century and described by Filarete, who had designed the castello in Milan. In several ways the mulberry tree in particular provided symbolic meaning for the celebration of the chancellor Ludovico Sforza, whose coat of arms in alliance with that of his wife Beatrice d'Este is displayed right in the center of the vault, surrounded by inscriptions with his latest accomplishments.

Besides providing charming bright spots of color, the red berries probably are an allusion to the Duke of Milan, nicknamed “il Moro”, because in the local dialect both then and today, those mulberries are called “moroni”. Its trunk was considered especially strong and architecturally relevant, a metaphor for a stable state, while the crown was able to shield from any adversity. Humanists knew that Pliny the Elder saw in him the wisest of all trees, since he blooms for a long time and his fruit ripens fast, which symbolized good governance. Ludovico initiated the planting of countless mulberry trees to promote the production of silk. The golden mesh of rope stood for the silk and gold fiber manufacturing Milan was famous for. The filament was also the thread of Ariadne and thus Ludovico was the new Theseus, a leader who withstands all trouble. The geometrical tracing relates also to the concept of the labyrinth. There was a garden labyrinth at the Castello Sforzesco in Vigevano, Ludovico's actual country residence, and Leonardo's illusion of a canopy should provide a substitute in the city.

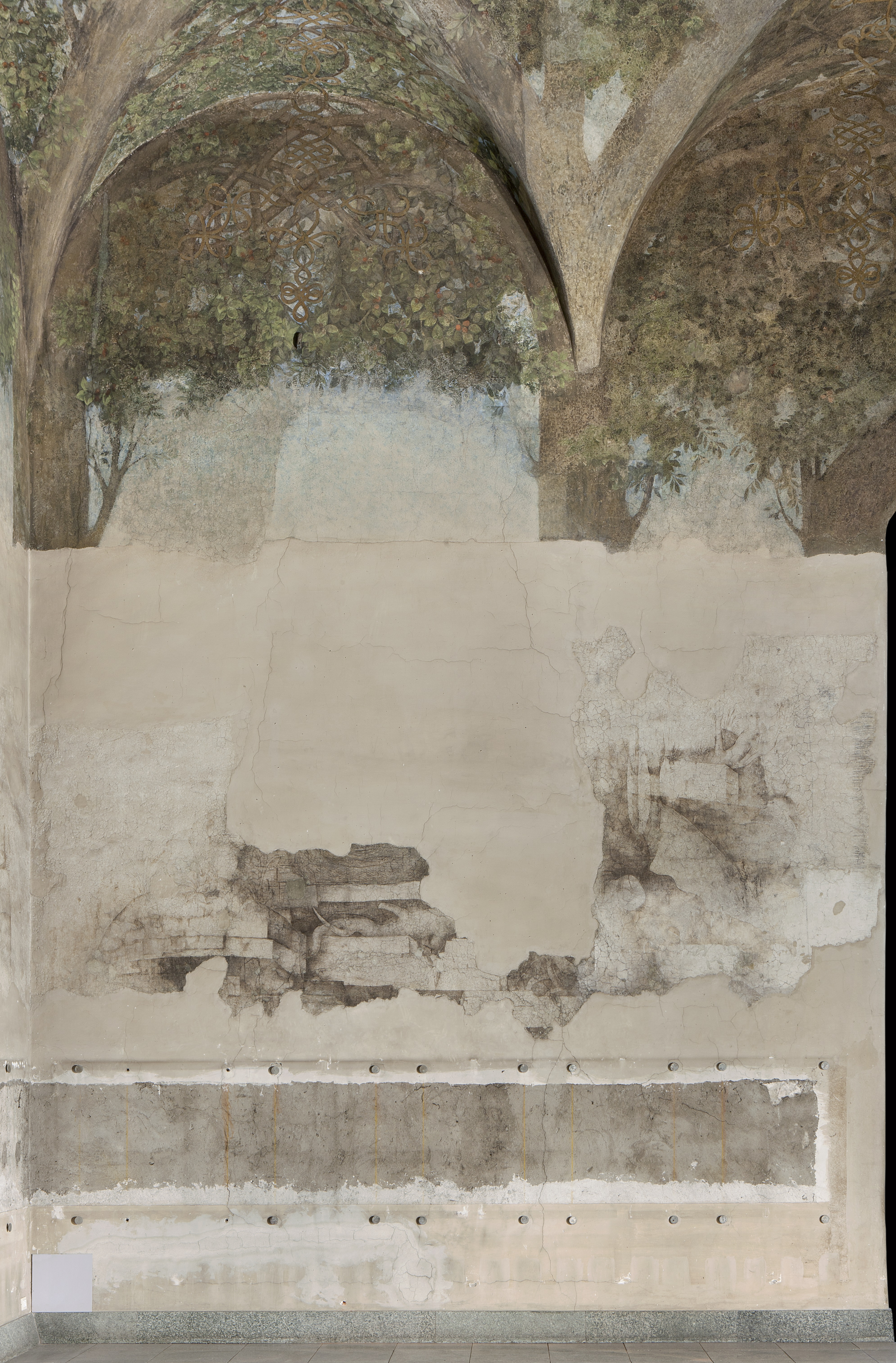
Vault, a monochrome and the installation holes for the panelling in 2013, prior to the third restoration

=== The monochromes ===
During the restoration in the 1950s, preparatory drawings for the original painting were uncovered, executed in black over white paint, instead of drawing directly on the plaster. The grounding with white paint is a technique now known to be a characteristic of Leonardo. Beltrami had considered these drawings as additions made earlier and covered them.

One of the merits of the current restoration is the uncovering of many of these underdrawings, called “monochrome” by the experts. Some of them show the roots of the trees penetrating the side walls and breaking them, with a decorative scheme reminiscent of the decoration of the Palazzo del Te in Mantua. Even more surprising, some other drawings suggest a different solution for the trunks. Cecilia Frosinini, from Opificio delle Pietre dure and member of the scientific committee, says that they suggest “the creation of thin, slanting trunks, springing from the roots and then joining the decoration on the ceiling”.

== Goals of the third restoration ==
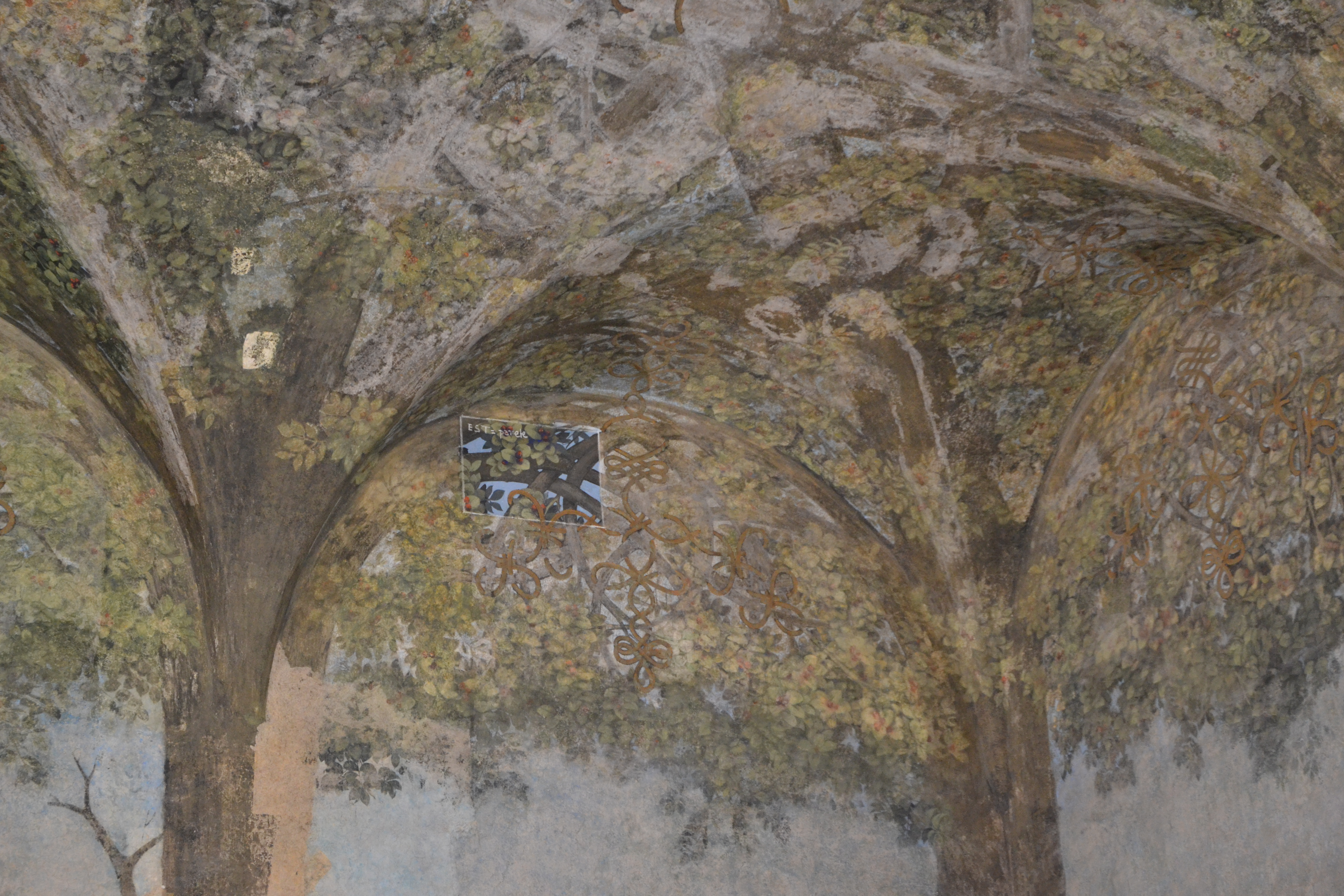
View into the vault in 2019, with a trial patch of the restoration

A new restoration of Sala delle Asse was started in 2012 and was ongoing as of 2022.

The immediate goal was to stop the evident deterioration. In this case, several factors have been identified: humidity from the building, microclimatic changes due to negative interaction (chemical binding) between the substances used for the original painting and the materials used for the various restorations, and accumulation of filth (since artifacts such as this can't be cleaned regularly as in a domestic house).

The long-term goal is to provide a valid “aesthetic restoration”. First of all, painted surfaces must be cleaned and stabilized. Then the problem of “peeling off” layers due to previous restorations and integrating missing spots with new painting (using modern materials, such as watercolor, for example) must be faced. There are different opinions about several issues: should previous painting layers (due to restoration) be totally removed? How much new painting is allowed? Too little, will leave the room in an aesthetically unpleasant state, too much will be somehow a “false”. The scientific committee (see below) is debating the issues, guiding and supervising operations.

Cecilia Frosinini from the Opificio delle pietre dure says "...modern restoration must be approached with great humility. It is necessary to appreciate both the original work of the author, and the work of the various restoration experts who followed.”

The restoration of the monochromes are a different story. It was not affected by previous restorations: it was not considered worthwhile and covered with wooden planks.

=== Activities ===
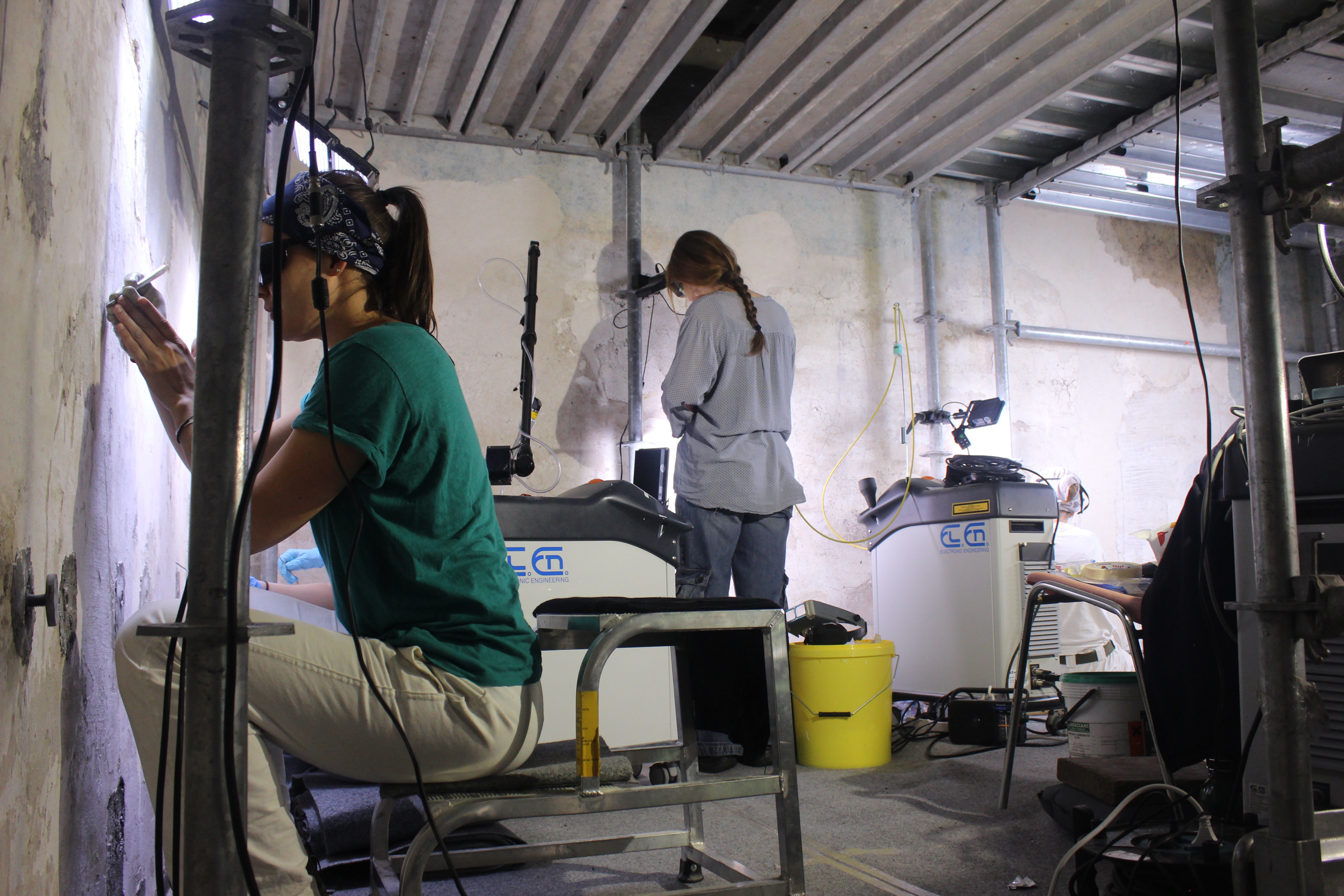
Technicians at work using laser scraping techniques in the sala delle asse

Various activities have been performed since 2012,

- Archive digging: relevant documentation has been brought to light or put in the proper perspective. The material includes original letters (from the time of the original painting of the room), historical documentation about the castle, and also about the two previous restorations.
- Architectural historical analysis: investigating all the historical events leading to the current situation of the room. Several alterations of the past openings in the room were detected and properly framed within the history of the castle.
- Technical diagnostics: several modern diagnostic techniques have been used.
  - Thermography (detecting differences in temperature on the walls) was used to identify alterations in the building of the rooms (since different materials have different temperatures).
  - Laser beams were used to build a precise 3-D model of the room.
  - UV fluorescence was used to detect various layers of painting. Ultraviolet light, in fact, can be used to detect the different “organic binders” of paint, i.e. the organic substances (e.g. eggs) used to keep the colors stable. These binders were different from the time of Leonardo, to later periods, and to the previous restorations.

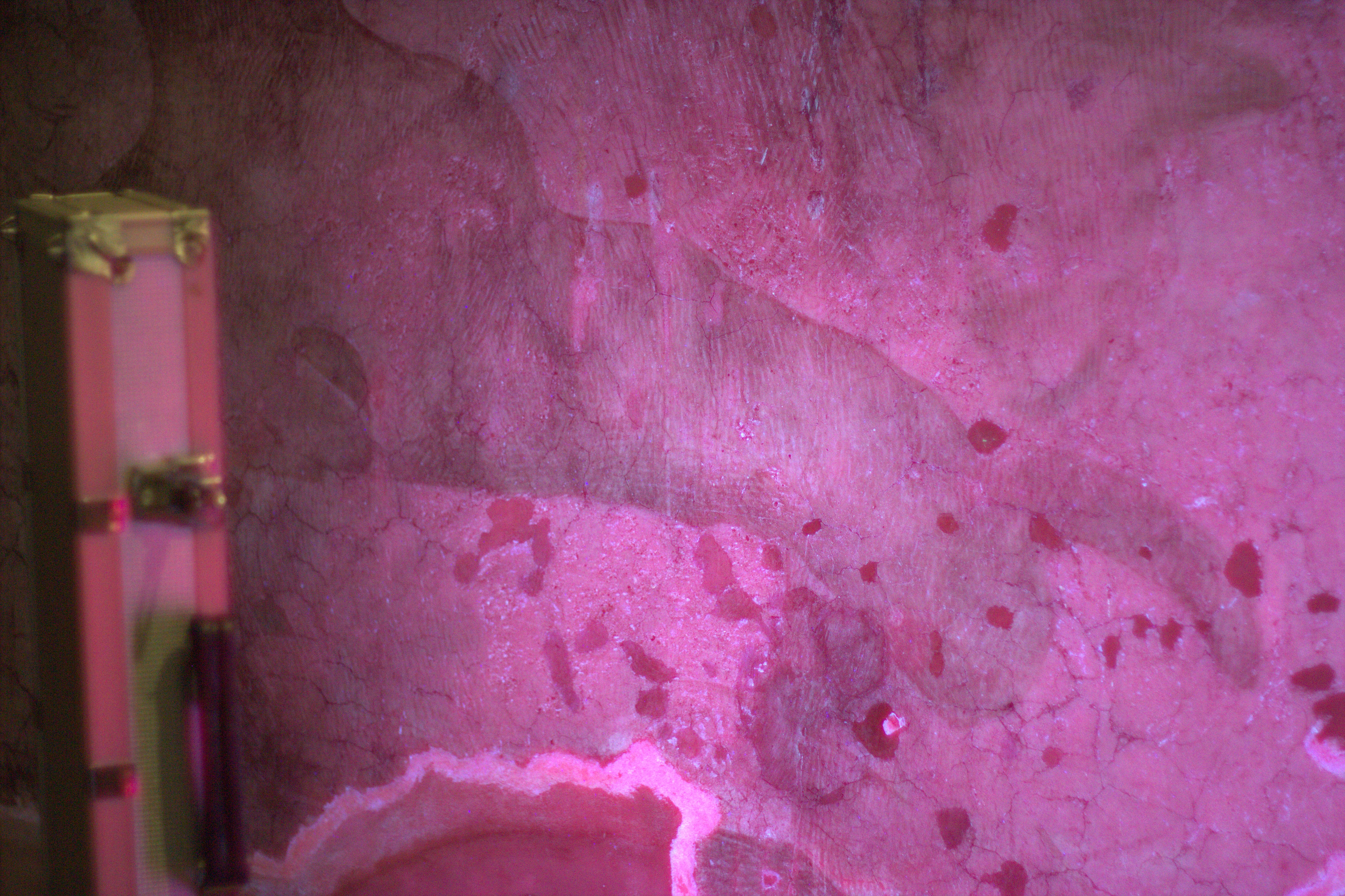
UV fluorescence on the monochrome

  - Spectroscopy (in the Infra-Red range) has been used to detect the various “inorganic binders” used for painting, at various times.
- Artistic analysis: A careful analysis of various documents and results from diagnostics, has allowed better understanding of the various events and actions that have brought the castle (in general) and Sala delle Asse (specifically) to the current situation.
- Restoring drawings and paintings
- Careful “peeling off” of layers has allowed uncovering of older layers. This has been especially relevant for bringing to light the monochrome, currently considered the oldest layer of decoration in the room. It is likely that the drawings were created by Leonardo while preparing for the painting.

== See also ==
- List of works by Leonardo da Vinci
