= Portrait of Isabella d'Este =

Portrait of Isabella d'Este may refer to:

- Portrait of Isabella d'Este (Leonardo)
- Portrait of Isabella d'Este (Titian)
