= Saint Jerome in the Wilderness (Leonardo) =

Unfinished painting by Leonardo da Vinci

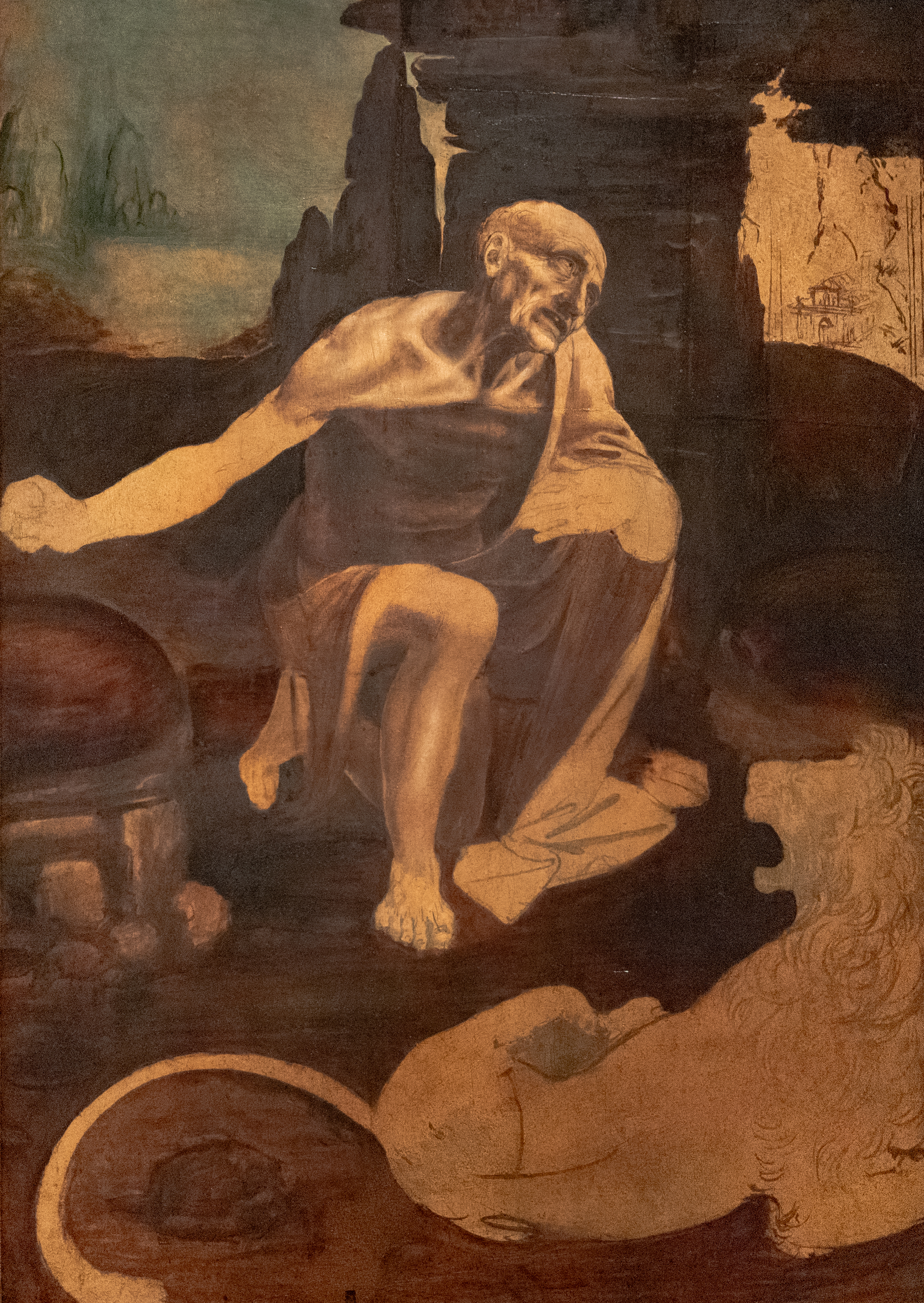
- Artist: Leonardo da Vinci
- Year: c. 1480–1490
- Type: Tempera and oil on walnut panel
- Dimensions: 103 cm × 75 cm (41 in × 30 in)
- Location: Vatican Museums; Rome

Saint Jerome in the Wilderness is an unfinished painting by the Italian Renaissance artist Leonardo da Vinci, dated c. 1480–1490. (Note: The date of c. 1480–1490 is based on those given by the following scholars: Kemp (2019, p. 31): c. 1481–1482; Marani (2003, p. 338): probably c. 1480; Syson (2011, p. 139): c. 1488–1490; Zöllner (2019, p. 221): c. 1480–1482) A recent study linked to the Lady with an Ermine carried out by Leonardo da Vinci at the same time supports this hypothesis. The composition of the painting has been drafted in monochrome onto the primed wooden panel. At an unknown date after Leonardo's death, the panel was cut into five pieces before eventually being restored into its original form (minus a very small triangle).

== Description ==
The oil draft of an unfinished painting depicts Saint Jerome in advanced age during his retreat to the Syrian desert, where he lived the life of a hermit. The saint kneels in a rocky landscape, gazing toward a crucifix which can be discerned faintly sketched in at the extreme right of the painting. In Jerome's right hand he holds a rock with which he is traditionally shown beating his chest in penance. At his feet is the lion which became a loyal companion after he extracted a thorn from its paw. The lion, the stone and a cardinal's hat are the traditional attributes of the saint.

On the left-hand side of the panel the background is a distant landscape of a lake surrounded by precipitous mountains shrouded in mist. To the right-hand side, the only discernible feature is a faintly-sketched church, seen through the opening in the rocks. The church's presence may allude to Jerome's position in Western Christianity as one of the Doctors of the Church.

The composition of the painting is innovative for the oblique trapezoid form of the figure of the saint. The angular forms contrast with the sinuous form of the lion which transcribes an "S" across the bottom of the painting. The lion is also a symbol of power and strength associated with the Gospel of Mark which Jerome translated into Latin. The form of Saint Jerome prefigures that of the Virgin Mary in the Virgin of the Rocks. The rendering of the muscles in the neck and shoulders is seen as the first of Leonardo's anatomical drawings.

== Interpretation ==
Penitence is one of the themes central to religious iconography. Jerome, who is primarily famous for his translation of the Bible into Latin, the so-called Vulgate, in old age retreated to the wilderness as a penitent. Here, as in any other paintings of this subject, he meditates on the crucified Christ. Beyond the crucifix may be seen the faint image of a church, probably representing a vision of the New Jerusalem, the heavenly afterlife to which Jerome aspires.

It has been speculated by George Bent that Leonardo's choice of subject matter here might relate directly to Leonardo's own spiritual life, most particularly to an accusation in 1476 of his involvement in homosexual activities with a male prostitute, Jacopo Saltarelli. Charges were brought on four young men because of an anonymous accusation. Homosexual activity was illegal in Florence. They were not convicted. According to Bent, Leonardo may be seen as experiencing remorse either for his ordeal or his transgression which allowed him to identify more closely with the suffering depicted in the Saint Jerome oil sketch.

== Provenance ==
The panel was cut into five parts at some point in its history and was reassembled for the early 19th-century collector, Cardinal Fesch, the uncle of Napoleon Bonaparte. Until recently accounts of its discovery were based on different variants of a popular legend, according to which the cardinal would have discovered the part of the panel with the saint's torso serving as a table top or box lid in a shop in Rome. Five years later, he would have found the head being used as a wedge for a shoemaker's bench. The true story is less colourful, but equally fascinating. The panel was evidently dismembered by the notoriously unscrupulous Roman art dealer Pietro Camuccini in order to extract the head, the most finished part of the painting, which he believed would fetch a higher price than the panel in its entirety. The four straight incisions he made in order to accomplish this shocking act of vandalism are still evident in images taken with the use of infrared reflectography. Pietro put the head on display in the Camuccini Gallery in Rome, which he owned together with his brother Vincenzo Camuccini. It was seen there in 1818 by Charlotte Anne Eaton. The following year the Camuccini brothers sold the head to Cardinal Fesch. Not long afterwards the cardinal, visiting the premises of a Roman art dealer — probably the Corrazzetto antiques shop on Piazza Navona, which he is known to have frequented — found a panel painting in the same style, but with a hole in the place where the head should have been. He rushed home to his residence at the Palazzo Falconieri, brought the head to the mentioned antiques shop, and to his delight discovered that the two pieces fitted together exactly. It seems that after selling the head, the Camuccini brothers had glued the remaining pieces back together and disposed of them on the Roman art market, no doubt for a paltry price. Having purchased the headless panel, the cardinal had the picture reassembled and restored to cover up the marks left after the incisions. For the remainder of his life he kept it in his private study, above his favourite armchair, deeming it to be his most precious possession. The repaired panel was sold in the cardinal’s posthumous sale, eventually to be acquired by Pope Pius IX, who installed it in the Pinacoteca Vaticana, now part of the Vatican Museums. The Saint Jerome was once believed to have been part of the collection of the painter Angelica Kauffman, but this theory too has been rejected by recent scholars. The Saint Jerome owned by Angelica Kauffman, which she mistakenly attributed to Leonardo, has been identified as a picture by Leonardo’s follower Cesare da Sesto, now in the Nationalmuseum in Stockholm.

== Exhibitions ==
Although normally on display at the Vatican Museums, Saint Jerome was loaned to the Metropolitan Museum of Art in New York during the summer of 2019 in the Robert Lehman Wing, from July 15 to the start of October. The display was a dedicated stand-alone presentation of the painting under subdued lighting for preservation purposes. From June 10 to September 20, 2022 it was loaned to an exhibition at Clos-Lucé near Amboise, Leonardo’s residence during the last year of his life that he spent in France in the service of King Francis I.

== See also ==
- List of works by Leonardo da Vinci

== Sources ==
- Kemp, Martin (2019). Leonardo da Vinci: The 100 Milestones. New York City: Sterling. ISBN 978-1454930426.
- Marani, Pietro C. (2003). Leonardo da Vinci: The Complete Paintings. New York: Harry N. Abrams, Inc. ISBN 978-0810991590.
- Syson, Luke; Keith, Larry; Galansino, Arturo; Mazzotta, Antonio; Nethersole, Scott; Rumberg, Per (2011). Leonardo da Vinci: Painter at the Court of Milan (1st ed.). London: National Gallery. ISBN 978-1857094916.
- Zöllner, Frank (2019). Leonardo da Vinci: The Complete Paintings and Drawings (Anniversary ed.). Cologne: Taschen.
