= The Holy Infants Embracing =

Lost painting attributed to Leonardo da Vinci

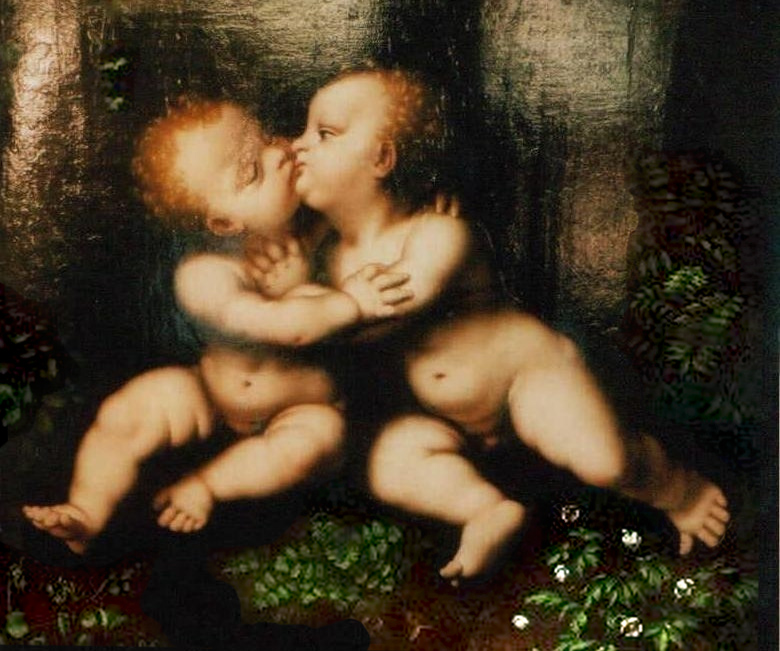
Detail of one of many copies of the Holy Children, Jesus and John the Baptist, embracing

The Holy Infants Embracing is a painting by Leonardo da Vinci. It represents the infant Christ embracing his cousin John the Baptist. The subject matter relates to the two paintings of the Virgin of the Rocks by Leonardo and numerous other Renaissance works by Raphael and others of the meeting of the two children on the road to Egypt while escaping the Massacre of the Innocents.

== History ==
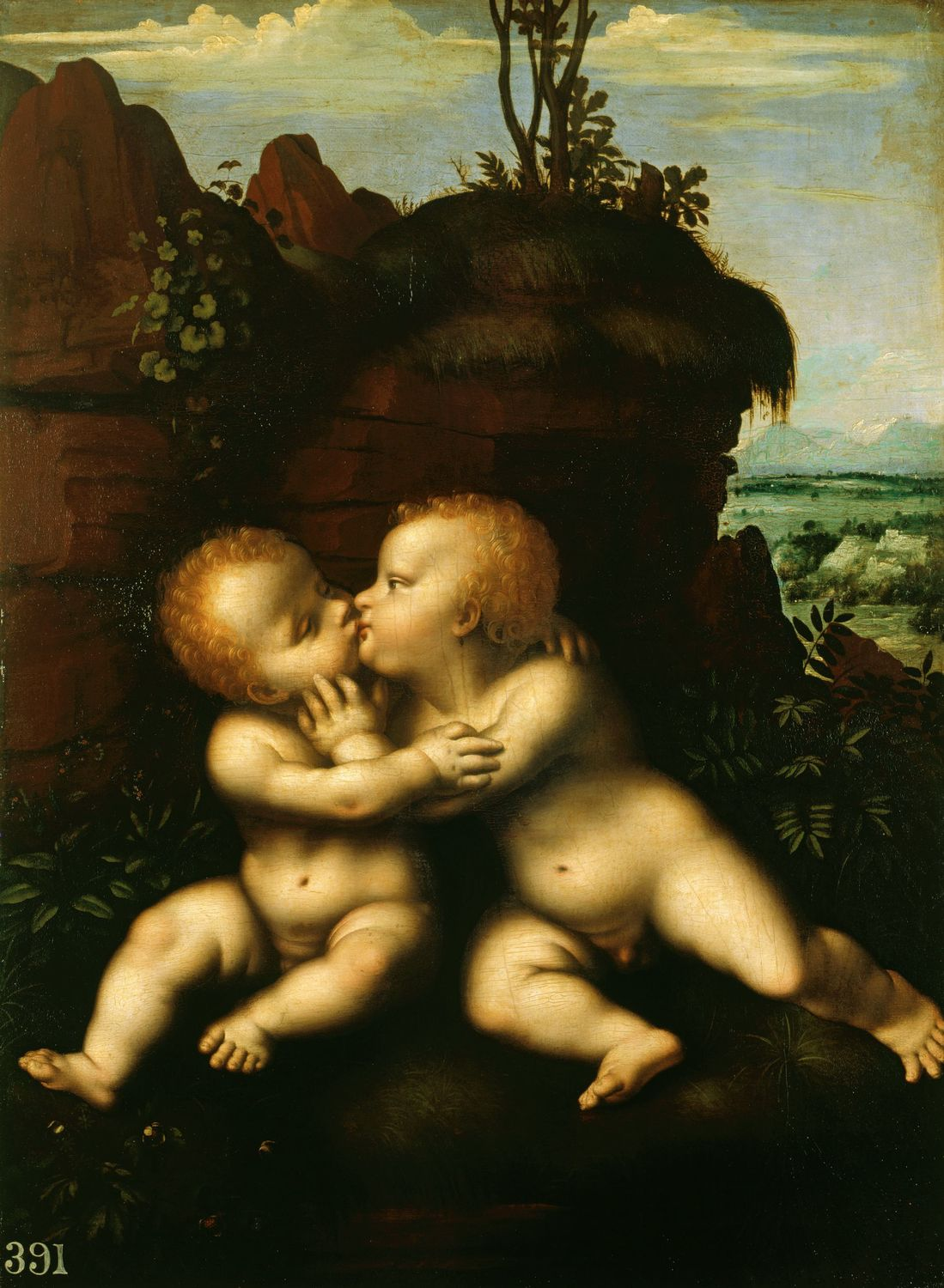
Version attributed to Marco d'Oggiono, purchased as by Leonardo in 1660 and still in the Royal Collection

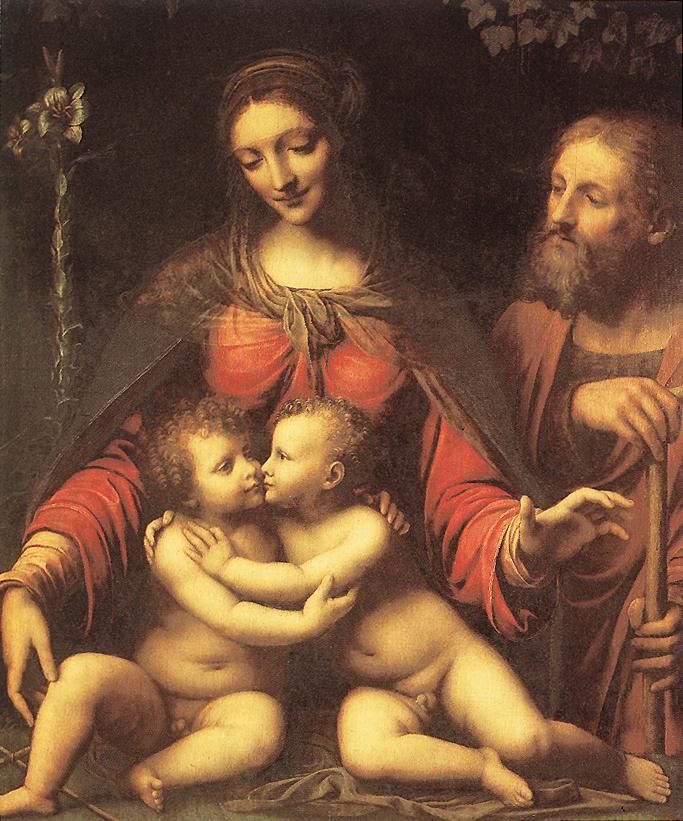
Holy Family with the Infant St John, by Bernardino Luini in the Prado

The subject of two Infants kissing was an inspirational source of quite a few (about thirty) copies of pupils and followers of Leonardo da Vinci. An early sketch of the subject by Leonardo himself is held at Windsor in the Royal collection. The sheet shows various studies of Madonna and Baby playing with the cat, while at the very bottom we see two infants kissing and embracing each other. The sketch is quite different from the version presented at numerous compositions, while the baby on the right is shown in a very same pose as Jesus in Virgin of the Rocks.

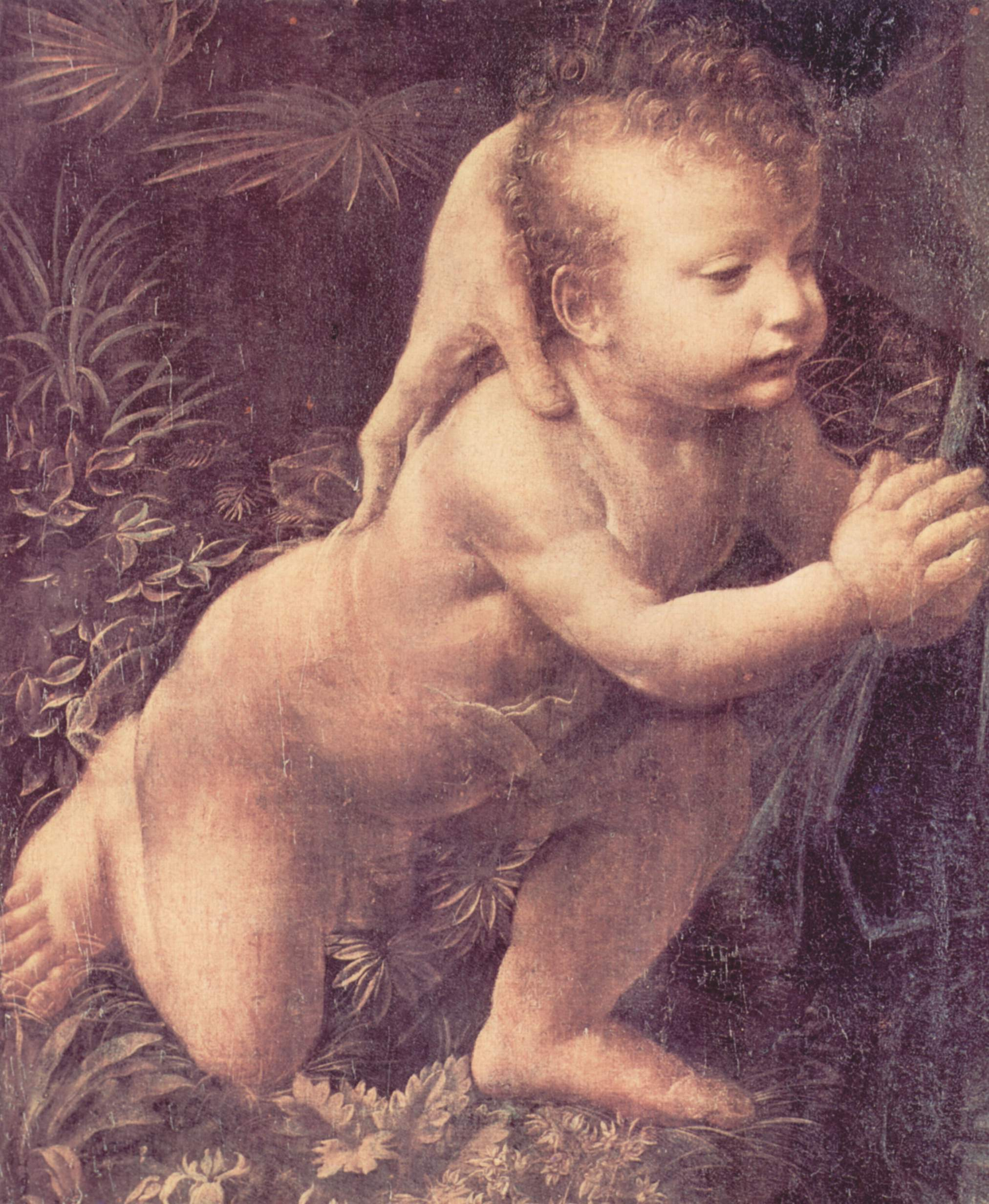
Detail of John in Virgin of the Rocks

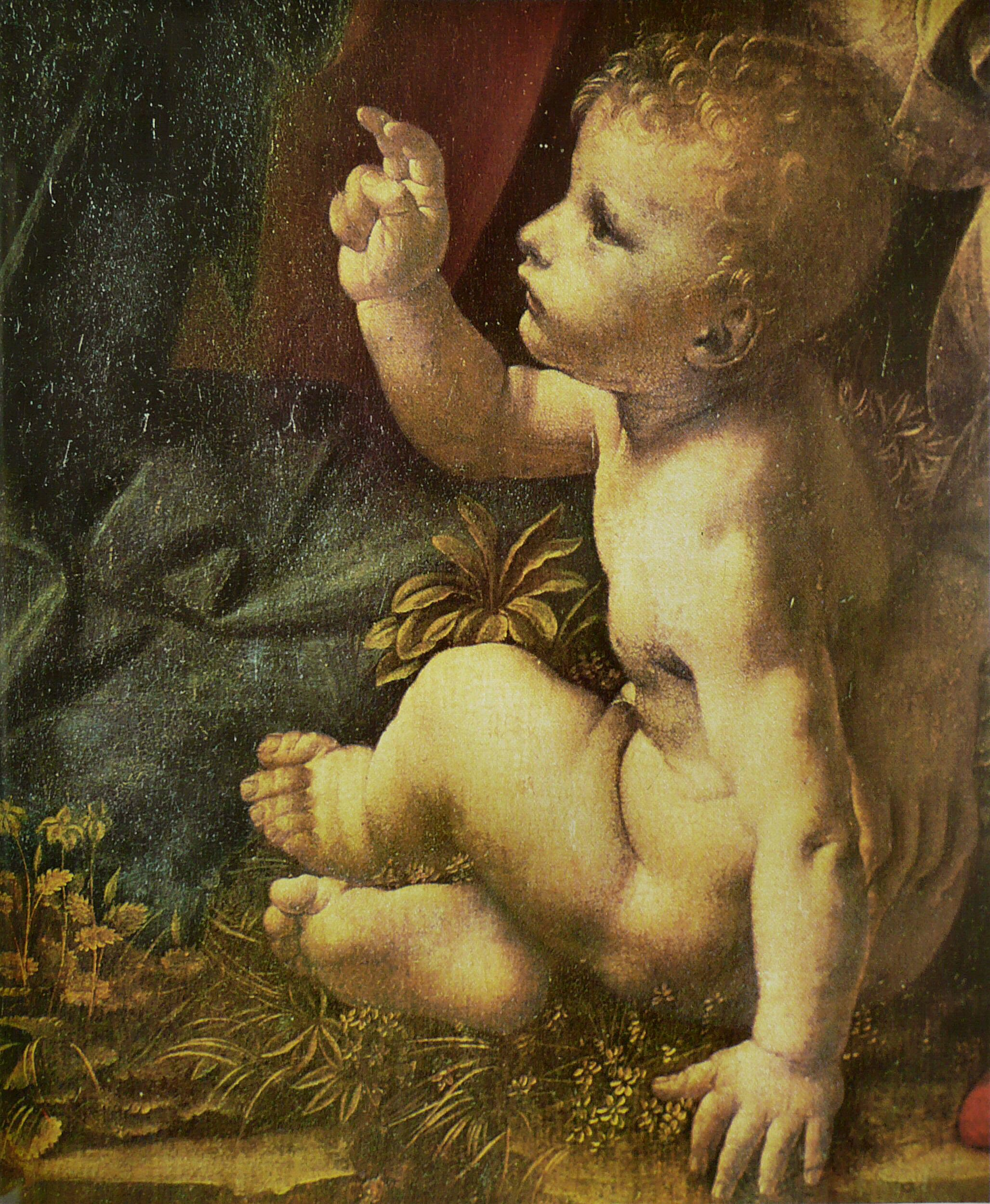
Detail of Jesus in Virgin of the Rocks

The connection between those paintings is evident in two copies made by Marco d'Oggiono (one of them - the Thuelin Madonna) and copy made by Bernardino dei Conti (lost during World War II). Madonna, very much like as the one depicted in Virgin of the Rocks is seen blessing two kissing children, representing Jesus and St John the Baptist. Other copies show half-length figure of Madonna leaning over the table with figures of embracing children (like copy by school of Leonardo da Vinci held at Burchill Collection, Milan, and a copy ascribed either to Marco d'Oggiono or Giampietrino). The painting of Holy Family (including holy infants embracing) by Bernardino Luini held at Prado, Madrid shows a similar representation. Most of the copies show only the group of two children in a quite different background. These include copies by Marco d'Oggiono, depicting holy children in a background of castle (Milan), grotto, rocky landscape (Windsor collection). The subject of two children kissing was repeated many times by another Leonardo follower, Joos van Cleve, who was called Leonardo des Nordens or "Leonardo of the North":

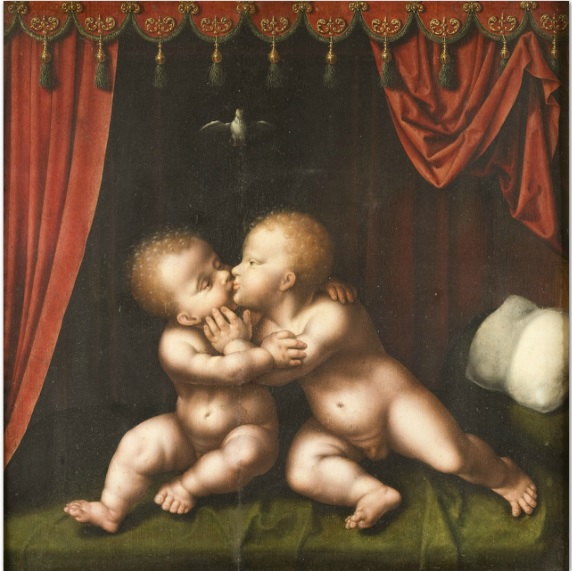
Version by Joos van Cleve at Museo di Capodimonte

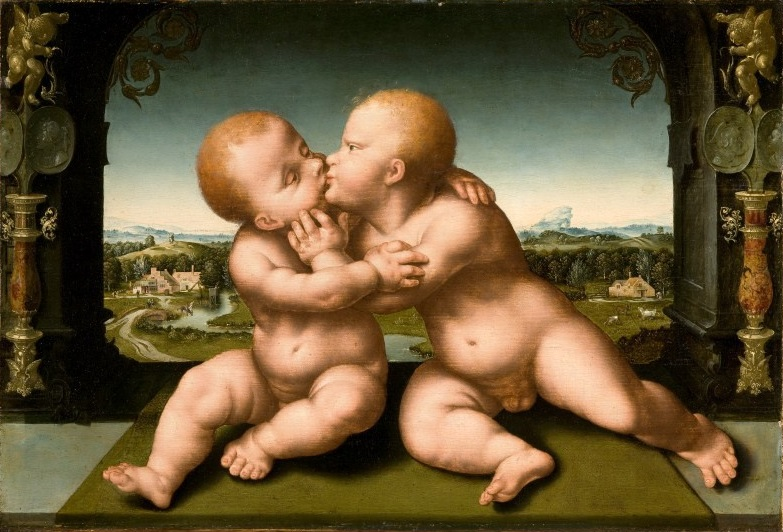
Version by Joos van Cleve at Museum Catharijneconvent

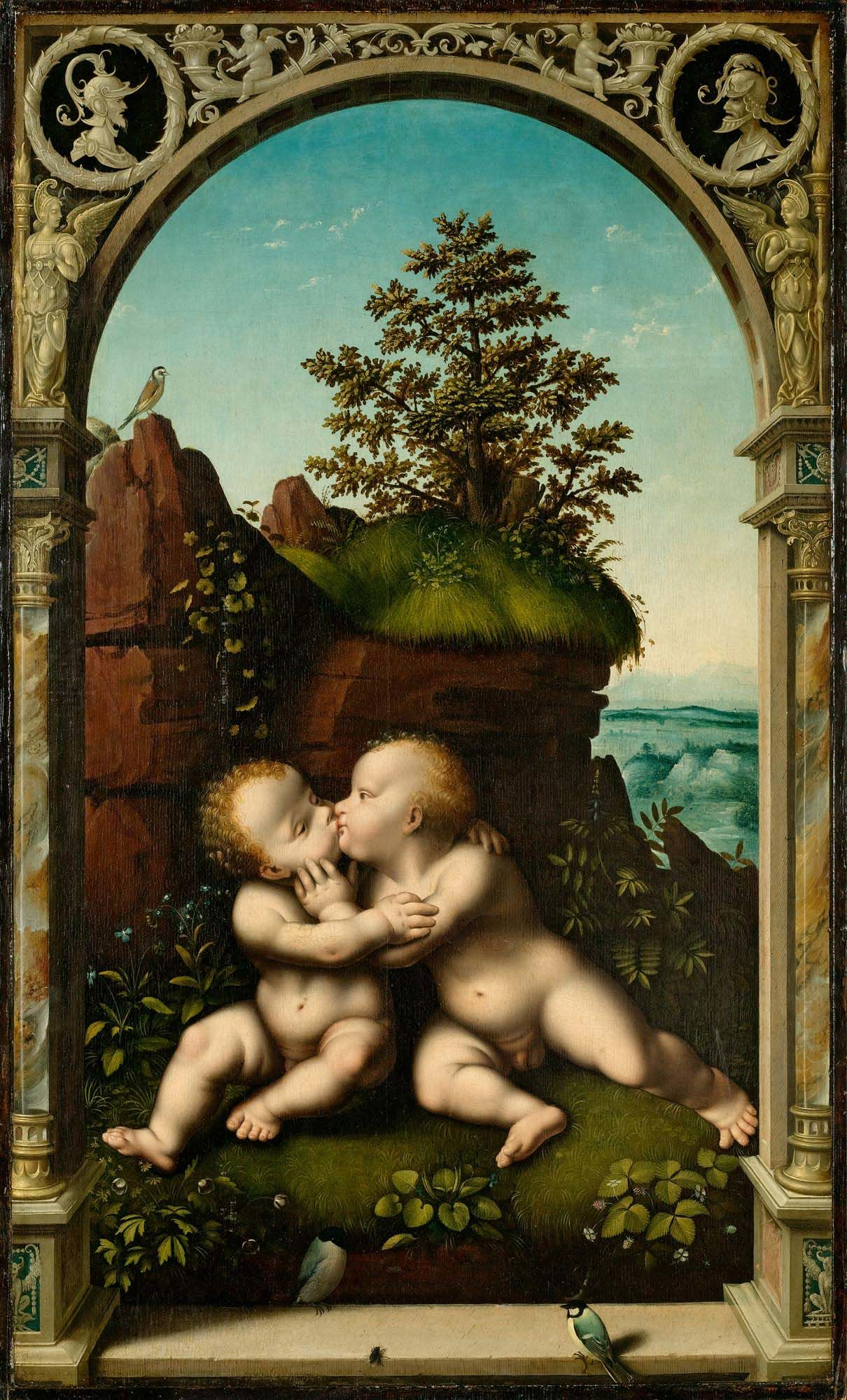
Version by Joos van Cleve sold at Koller in 2012

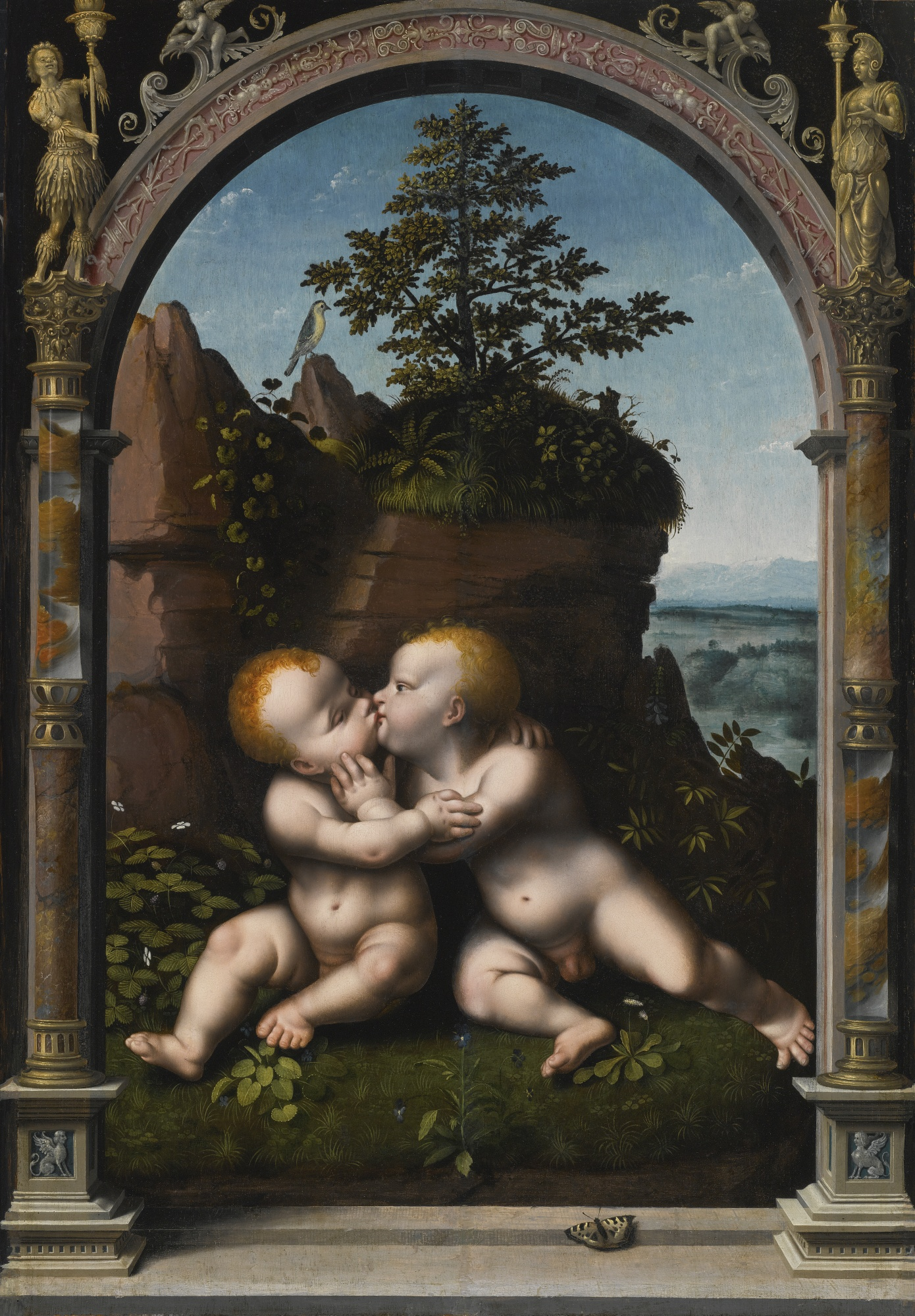
Version by Joos van Cleve sold at Sotheby's in 2013

He often produced almost identical paintings of the subject: like three paintings held respectively at Museo Musei vicino Matteo Lampertico Arte antica e moderna, Milan; private collection, Switzerland and private collection in USA (showing a very similar background to the Windsor version; also in Royal collection, Brussels, The Art Institute of Chicago and Mauritshuis collection, Hague. Other copies by artist are held also at Naples and Vienna, sold at various auction houses recently. Joos van Cleve is responsible for introducing the composition among artists of Northern Europe, while numerous copies today are ascribed to the followers of Joos van Cleve. A 2006 Discovery Channel co-produced documentary called "Da Vinci's Lost Code" attempted to authenticate the provenance of the "Lost Babies" painting, whose owner believed it to be painted by Leonardo.

== See also ==
- List of works by Leonardo da Vinci
