= Frank Zöllner =

German art historian (born 1956)

- Born: 26 June 1956 (age 70); Bremen, Germany
- Known for: Scholarship on Leonardo da Vinci

Academic background
- Education: University of Hamburg (1987)

Academic work
- Discipline: Italian Renaissance art
- Institutions: Bibliotheca Hertziana; University of Leipzig

Frank Zöllner (born 26 June 1956) is a German art historian. He is among the leading authorities on the life and works of Leonardo da Vinci, about whom he has written numerous publications. These include book-length studies on the Mona Lisa and one of the two modern catalogues raisonnés of Leonardo's works, the other being by Pietro C. Marani.

He has been a professor of art history at Leipzig University since 1996.

== Life and career ==
Frank Zöllner was born on 26 June 1956 in Bremen, Germany. He first studied art history from 1977 to 1981. From 1983 to 1985, he was an Aby Warburg Fellow at the Warburg Institute in London, studying with the art historian Ernst Gombrich. Zöllner attended the University of Hamburg, graduating in 1987 with a PhD on the Renaissance-era artistic reception of Vitruvius.

Zöllner worked from 1988 to 1992 as a research assistant at the Bibliotheca Hertziana in Rome. He received his Habilitation degree from the University of Marburg in 1987. Since 1996, Zöllner has been a professor of medieval and modern art history at Leipzig University.

Zöllner's Leonardo da Vinci: The Complete Paintings and Drawings (2003), alongside Pietro C. Marani's Leonardo da Vinci: The Complete Paintings (2000), is "the most thoroughly referenced catalogue raisonnés of Leonardo’s paintings". He has also published a catalogue raisonné of works by Sandro Botticelli, in 2005.

== Honors and awards ==
- Leipzig Science Award of Saxon Academy of Sciences (2009)
- 2013 Member of the Saxon Academy of Sciences

== Selected writings ==
=== Books ===
- Zöllner, Frank (1987). Vitruvs Proportionsfigur: Quellenkritische Studien zur Kunstliteratur im 15. und 16. Jahrhundert [Vitruvius's Proportional Figure: Source-Critical Studies on Art Literature in the 15th and 16th centuries] (PDF) (Thesis) (in German). Worms: Wernersche Verlagsgesellschaft. ISBN 978-3-88462-913-0. OCLC 18204225.
- Vitruvs Proportionsfigur. Quellenkritische Studien zur Kunstliteratur des 15. und 16. Jahrhunderts. Worms 1987.
- Leonardo da Vinci. Mona Lisa. Das Porträt der Lisa del Giocondo. Legende und Geschichte. Frankfurt 1994. (feat.).
- La Battaglia di Anghiari di Leonardo da Vinci fra mitologia e politica. Lettura Vinciana 1997. Text [summary]
- Bilder des Frühlings und der Liebe: Die mythologischen Gemälde Sandro Botticellis. Munich/New York 1998.
- Leonardo da Vinci. Benedikt Taschen Verlag Cologne 1999. ISBN 3-8228-6363-7
- Michelangelos Fresken in der Sixtinischen Kapelle. Gesehen von Giorgio Vasari und Ascanio Condivi. Freiburg im Breisgau 2002 (Rombach Wissenschaften, Quellen zur Kunst, Bd. 17).
- Leonardo da Vinci. The Complete Paintings and Drawings. Cologne 2003.
- Papierpaläste. Illustrierte Architekturtheorie des 15. bis 18. Jahrhunderts. Katalog zur Ausstellung vom 16. März bis 14. Mai 2005 in der Universitätsbibliothek Albertina (Schriften aus der Universitätsbibliothek, 9), Leipzig 2005.
- Sandro Botticelli. Munich 2005 [German]; 2005 [English], 2nd edn. 2015.
- "Speicher der Erinnerung". Die mittelalterlichen Ausstattungsstücke der Leipziger Universitätskirche St. Pauli, 2005 [editor].
- Leonardos Mona Lisa. Vom Porträt zur Ikone der Freien Welt (Wagenbachs Taschenbuch Band 552). Verlag Klaus Wagenbach, Berlin 2006, ISBN 978-3-8031-2552-1
- Georg Wünschmann (1868–1937). Ein Leipziger Architekt und die Pluralität der Stile, Leipzig 2006 [editor].
- Michelangelo – Das vollständige Werk. (zusammen mit Christof Thönes und Thomas Pöpper), Cologne 2007
- Griffelkunst. Mythos, Traum und Liebe in Max Klingers Grafik. Plöttner Verlag, Leipzig 2007, ISBN 978-3938442319
- Bewegung und Ausdruck bei Leonardo da Vinci. Plöttner Verlag, Leipzig 2009, ISBN 978-3938442692
- Tübke Stiftung Leipzig. Bestandskatalog der Zeichnungen und Aquarelle. Plöttner Verlag, Leipzig 2009, [editor] ISBN 978-3938442739

=== Articles ===
- Leonardo's Portrait of Mona Lisa del Giocondo Gazette des Beaux-Arts 121(S.)115–138. 1993 DOI 10.11588/artdok.00004207 ISSN 0016-5530
- What the satyrs taught. – The Time # 31, July 29, 2010
- Neo Rauch Understand: With tighter Wade. – The Time # 22, May 26, 2011
