= Portrait of Isabella d'Este (Leonardo) =

Drawing by Leonardo da Vinci, 1499/1500

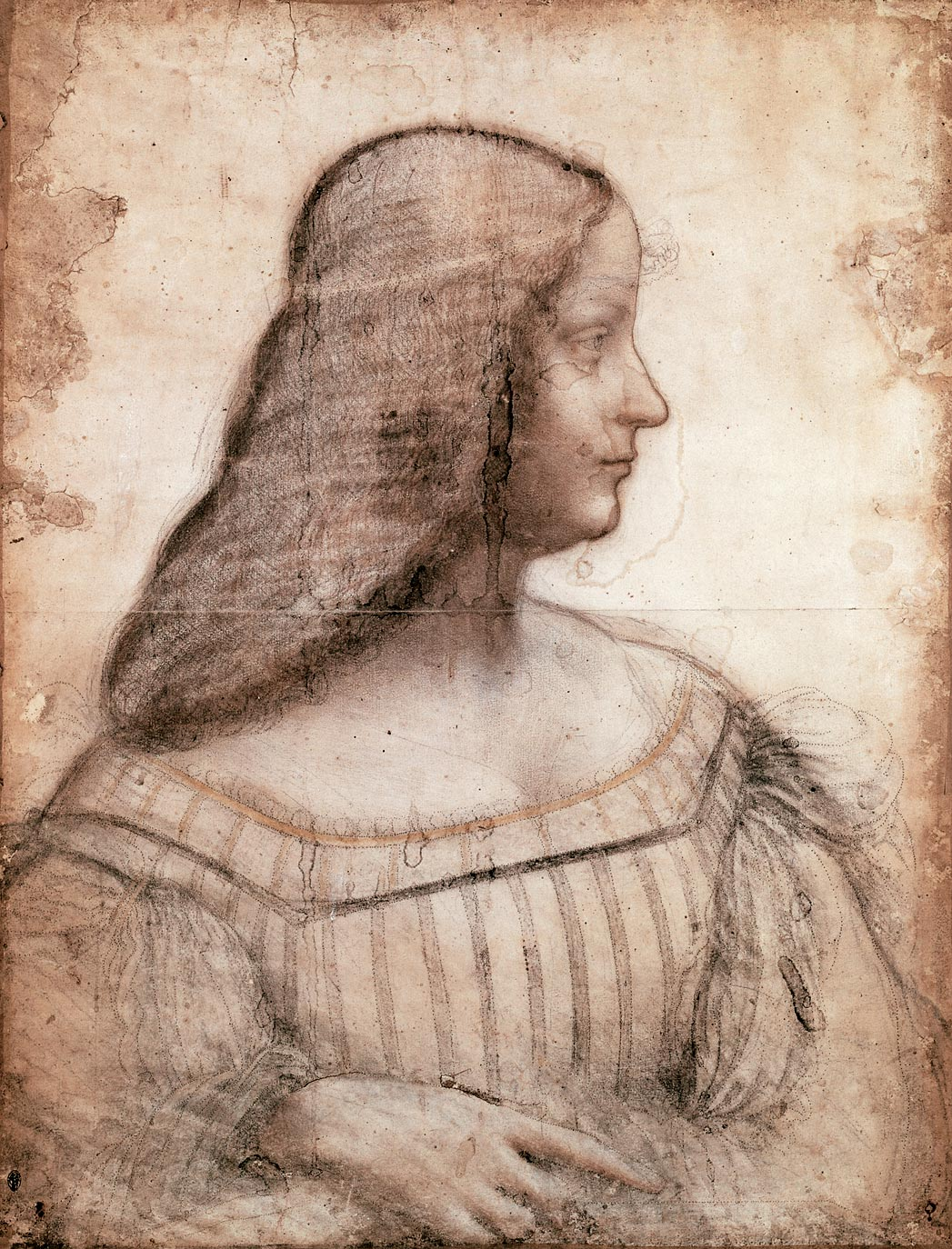
- Artist: Leonardo da Vinci
- Year: c. 1499–1500
- Medium: Black and red chalk, yellow pastel chalk on paper
- Dimensions: 61 cm × 46.5 cm (24 in × 18.3 in)
- Location: Louvre, Paris

The Portrait of Isabella d'Este is a drawing (and possible painting) by Leonardo da Vinci which was executed between 1499 and 1500. It depicts Isabella d'Este, Marchioness of Mantua. During the Italian Wars of 1499–1504, the French invaded Italy which caused Leonardo to flee from Milan to Mantua. There he had met Isabella, where she commissioned her portrait from him. Whether Leonardo completed the portrait is unknown. There is evidence through letters of the time that he held a fully completed painting of her, but they are vague in describing it. It was thought that the painting was lost to time or, perhaps, never completed at all.

A version of the portrait in oils on canvas, carbon-dated to the start of the 16th century, was discovered via private auction in Switzerland and, consequently, seized by authorities in 2015. Whether the painting is Leonardo's lost work or the work of a contemporary 'in the style of' remains unknown, as the piece awaits authentification.
