= Pietro C. Marani =

Italian art historian (born 1952)

- Born: Pietro Cesare Marani; 1952 (age 73–74)
- Known for: Scholarship on Leonardo da Vinci

Academic work
- Discipline: Italian Renaissance art
- Institutions: Polytechnic University of Milan; Pinacoteca di Brera

Pietro Cesare Marani (born 1952) is an Italian art historian and curator. He is among the leading authorities on the life and works of Leonardo da Vinci having written of over 200 publications on the artist. These include book-length studies on the Portrait of a Musician and The Last Supper, an overview on Leonardo's time in Venice, and one of the two modern catalogue raisonné of Leonardo's works, the other being by Frank Zöllner.

He is currently a professor of art history at the Polytechnic University of Milan.

== Life and career ==
Pietro Cesare Marani was born in 1952 in Italy. In his youth he studied with the art historian Anna Maria Brizio, a specialist on the works of Leonardo da Vinci. His earliest publications concerned the fortification designs of Leonardo. Currently, Marani is a Full Professor in Modern Art History at the Polytechnic University of Milan, as well as president of the Raccolta Vinciana institute.

His past roles include leadership posts at the Soprintendenza per I Beni Artistici e Storici della Lombardia Occidentale (director), the Pinacoteca di Brera (vice director), and The Last Supper's restoration project (co-director). He has curated many Leonardo exhibitions throughout Italy, particularly in 2019 during the 500th anniversary of the artist's death.

Marani's publications include more than 284 articles and books on the life and works of Leonardo da Vinci. Among them are Leonardo and Venice, Leonardo da Vinci's Last Supper (2009) on The Last Supper, and Leonardo da Vinci: Il musico on the Portrait of a Musician. Marani's Leonardo da Vinci: The Complete Paintings (2000), alongside Frank Zöllner's Leonardo da Vinci: The Complete Paintings and Drawings (2003), is "the most thoroughly referenced catalogue raisonnés of Leonardo’s paintings". He has written numerous essays on other Italian Renaissance artists, including Francesco di Giorgio Martini, Ambrogio Bergognone, Bramantino and Bernardino Luini, and contemporary artists such as Peter Greenaway, Igor Mitoraj, Alessandro Papetti and Medhat Shafik.

The art historian Kim H. Veltman described Marani in 2008 as "clearly the most significant scholar in the field [of Leonardo's art] at present", and by his colleague Martin Kemp in 2018 as "the greatest of his generation of Italian Leonardisti". In 2023 the Accademia Nazionale dei Lincei gave him the Tartufari Award for the best Art Critic and Poetry.

== Selected bibliography ==
- Marani, Pietro C. (1999). Leonardo: Una Carriera di Pittore [Leonardo: A Career as a Painter] (in Italian). Milan: Frederico Motta. ISBN 978-88-7179-196-8.
- Marani, Pietro C. (2000). Leonardo da Vinci: The Complete Paintings. New York: Harry N. Abrams. ISBN 978-0-8109-3581-5.
- Marani, Pietro (2009). Leonardo da Vinci's Last Supper. Milan: Skira Editore.
- Marani, Pietro C., ed. (2010). Leonardo da Vinci: Il musico (in Italian). Cinisello Balsamo: Silvana. ISBN 978-88-366-1923-8.
