= Carmen C. Bambach =

American art historian and curator

- Born: April 26, 1959 (age 67)
- Occupations: Art historian Curator
- Known for: Italian and Spanish drawings; especially Leonardo da Vinci

Carmen C. Bambach (born April 27, 1959) is a Chilean art historian and curator of Italian and Spanish drawings at the New York Metropolitan Museum of Art who specializes in Italian Renaissance art. She is considered one of the world's leading specialists on Leonardo da Vinci, especially his drawings.

== Career ==
Bambach received her bachelor's, master's, and doctoral degrees from Yale University.

Commenting on the 2017 exhibition of over 130 Michelangelo drawings at the Metropolitan Museum of Art, "Michelangelo: Divine Draftsman and Designer", Bambach, who curated the showing, attributed a black chalk sketch to the artist against the then current consensus among her colleagues.

She published the four-volume Leonardo da Vinci Rediscovered in 2019 to mixed reviews. The same year, she was the first recipient of the Vilcek Prize for Excellence, recognizing work that reflects immigration's impact on American society.

In 2020, an honoree of the Great Immigrants Award named by Carnegie Corporation of New York.

In 2026, she curated the exhibition Raphael: Sublime Poetry at the Metropolitan Museum of Art.

== Selected works ==
- Bambach, Carmen C., ed. (2003). Leonardo da Vinci, Master Draftsman. New York City, New York: Metropolitan Museum of Art. ISBN 978-0-300-09878-5.
- —— (2019). Leonardo da Vinci Rediscovered. Vol. 1, The Making of an Artist: 1452–1500. New Haven: Yale University Press. ISBN 978-0-300-19195-0.
- —— (2019). Leonardo da Vinci Rediscovered. Vol. 2. New Haven: Yale University Press.
- —— (2019). Leonardo da Vinci Rediscovered. Vol. 3. New Haven: Yale University Press.
- —— (2019). Leonardo da Vinci Rediscovered. Vol. 4. New Haven: Yale University Press.
- Bambach, Carmen C., ed. Raphael: Sublime Poetry, exhibition catalogue (New York: Metropolitan Museum of Art, distributed by Yale University Press, 2026).

== Sources ==
- Christensen, Lauren (July 27, 2019). "A da Vinci for Any Budget". The New York Times.
- Cotter, Holland (July 11, 2019). "What Leonardo da Vinci Couldn't Finish". The New York Times.
- Povoledo, Elisabetta (August 22, 2008). "A Portrait by Leonardo? Scholars and Skeptics Differ". The New York Times.
- Vogel, Carol (January 20, 2003). "Renaissance Genius as Compulsive Draftsman; An Exhibition Explores Leonardo's Creative Process With a Wealth of Examples". The New York Times.
