= Vincenzo Palmieri =

Italian priest and theologian (1757–1820)

Vincenzo Palmieri (1757 - 18 March 1820) was an Italian oratorian priest and theologian with Jansenist leanings.

== Biography ==
He was born in Genoa. He obtained for him an appointment as professor of church history in Pisa and subsequently at the University of Pavia. In Pavia, he became allied with his fellow professors Tamburini and Zola, who proposed, among other ideas, a more decentralized Catholicism, with less papal power and more freedom to local bishops. He participated in the Synod of Pistoia.

== Works ==
Among his works:

- Istituzioni di storia ecclesiastica (1789) dedicated to Grand Duke of Tuscany, Pietro Leopoldo
- Trattato historico, critico, e dogmatico delle indulgenze (1788) - Treatise criticizing the granting of indulgences in exchange for either actions or donations, often at the time, churches would post on tablets the "rates" quoted for indulgences.
- La libertà e la legge considerate nella libertà di opinione e nella tolleranza dè culti
