= Pieve di San Gaudenzio, Ostiano =

Church in Italy

Coordinates: 45°13′37″N 10°15′14″E

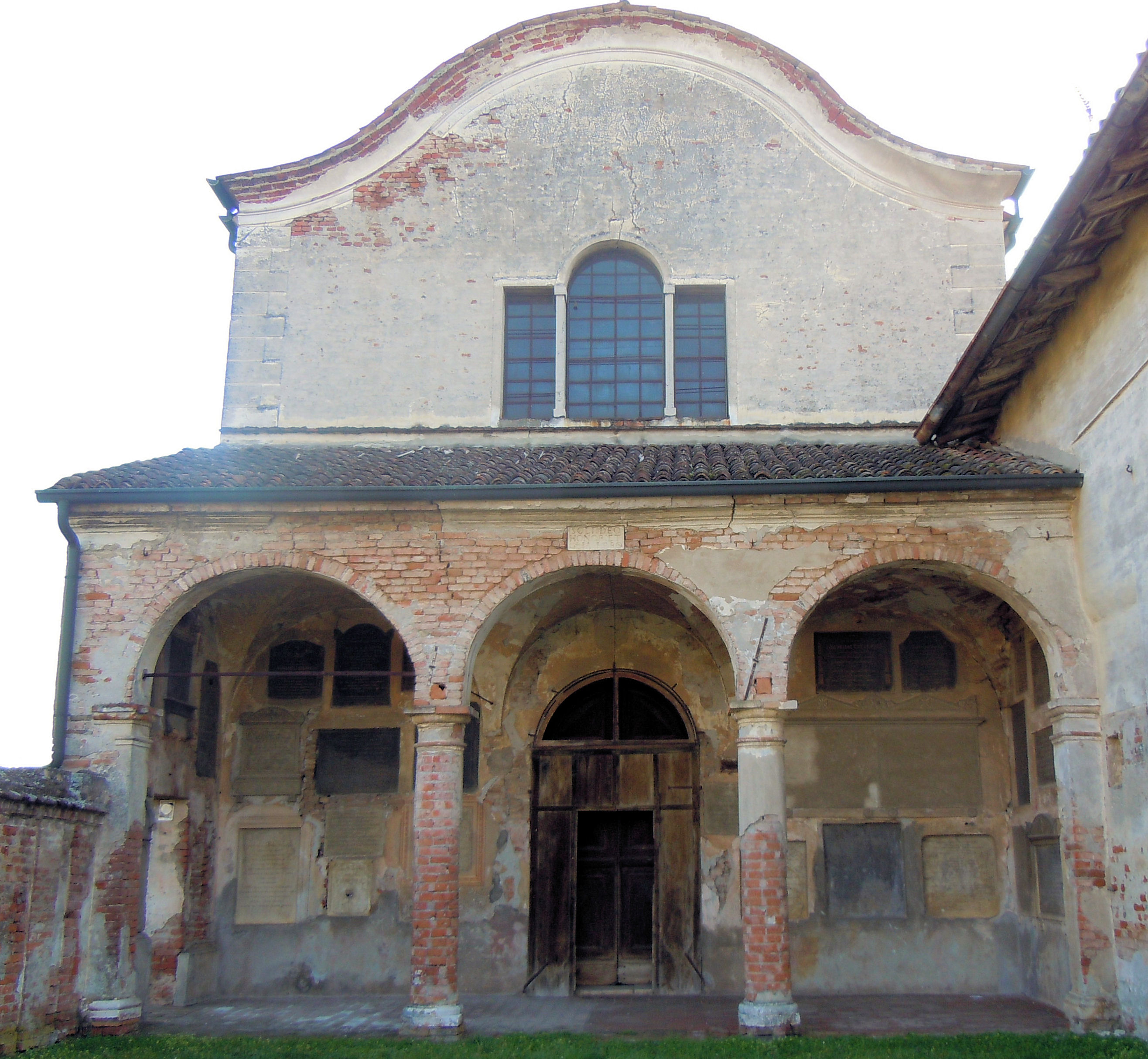
Ostiano, Pieve di San Gaudenzio.

The Pieve di San Gaudenzio is a Roman Catholic church, located in Ostiano in the province of Cremona, region of Lombardy, Italy.

== History ==
This church was erected in 1580, atop the site of a prior structure, under the patronage of Vespasiano Gonzaga. It was previously attached to a convent, and survived the suppression of orders as the church for an adjacent cemetery. The interior houses the wooden music and organ loft once in the town parish church of San Michele Arcangelo. The structure is in dire need of restoration.
