= Solarolo Rainerio =

Solarolo Rainerio Sularóol Rainéri (Lombard)
- Comune
- Comune di Solarolo Rainerio
- Location within Italy Location within Lombardy
- Coordinates: 45°5′N 10°21′E
- Country: Italy
- Region: Lombardy
- Province: Province of Cremona (CR)

Area
  - Total: 11.4 km^{2} (4.4 sq mi)

Population (Dec. 2004)
  - Total: 1,016
  - Density: 89.1/km^{2} (231/sq mi)
- Time zone: UTC+1 (CET)
  - Summer (DST): UTC+2 (CEST)
- Postal code: 26030
- Dialing code: 0375

Solarolo Rainerio (Cremunés: Sularóol Rainéri) is a comune (municipality) in the Province of Cremona in the Italian region Lombardy, located about 100 kilometres (62 mi) southeast of Milan and about 25 kilometres (16 mi) east of Cremona. As of 31 December 2004 it had a population of 1016 and an area of 11.4 square kilometres (4.4 mi^{2}).

Solarolo Rainerio borders the following municipalities: Gussola, Piadena, San Giovanni in Croce, San Martino del Lago, Scandolara Ravara, Voltido.

== Demographic evolution ==
Historical population

Year	Pop.	±%
1861	2,016	—
1871	2,271	+12.6%
1881	2,223	−2.1%
1901	2,155	−3.1%
1911	2,322	+7.7%

Year	Pop.	±%
1921	2,089	−10.0%
1931	2,018	−3.4%
1936	1,946	−3.6%
1951	1,878	−3.5%
1961	1,575	−16.1%

Year	Pop.	±%
1971	1,192	−24.3%
1981	1,037	−13.0%
1991	966	−6.8%
2001	989	+2.4%

Source: Data from ISTAT

== Culture ==
Solarolo Rainerio has had a municipal library since 1965.

== Infrastructure and transportation ==
Between 1888 and 1928 Solarolo Rainerio was served by the stop of the same name located along the Ca' de Soresini-San Giovanni in Croce branch line of the Cremona-Casalmaggiore tramway, ultimately operated by the Tramvie Provinciali Cremonesi company.
