= Pietro Tamburini =

Italian theologian and jurist (1737–1827)

- Born: 1 January 1737; Brescia, Republic of Venice
- Died: 14 March 1827; Pavia, Kingdom of Lombardy–Venetia
- Occupations: Theologian, Catholic priest
- Employer: University of Pavia
- Movement: Jansenism

Pietro Tamburini (1 January 1737 – 14 March 1827) was an Italian theologian and jurist. He openly espoused Jansenism as a university professor.

== Biography ==
Pietro was born in Brescia and was educated by local priest, including the Dominican friar Vincenzo Pavoni, and later at seminary, by the Theatine father G.B. Scarella, who had Jansenist leanings. Tamburini was ordained a priest in 1760. Under the patronage of the Bishop of Brescia, later Cardinal, Giovanni Molin, he was appointed professor of metaphysics at the Brescian episcopal seminary. In 1771, he published a treatise on grace, De summa catholicae de gratia Christi doctrinae praestantia, utilitate, necessitate, dissertatio cum thesibus de variis humanae naturae statibus et de gratia Christi, in which he attacked the Jesuits. Initially published in Brescia, it was reprinted in Rome in 1773 and Florence in 1776, later throughout Europe. Bishop Molin under pressure by the Jesuits, by the local parish priests and by his own vicar general, dismissed Tamburini from his chair at the end of 1772.

Thus in 1773, Tamburini moved to Rome and due to the help of Cardinal Mario Marefoschi, he obtained the post at the Collegio Irlandese, where the theologian Luigi Cuccagni also taught. There he befriended fellow Jansenists, Giovanni Gaetano Bottari, Pier Francesco Foggini, Scipione de' Ricci, Giovanni Cristoforo Amaduzzi, Paolo del Mare, Giuseppe Zola, and Francesco Alpruni. During the meetings of the circle, which took the name of "Circolo dell'Archetto", Tamburini circulated pages of a philosophical-theological treatise. However, with the untimely death of Pope Clement XIV and the ascension to the papal throne of Pius VI, the papal policy became hostile to Jansenism.

Empress Maria Theresa of Austria, who had been lobbied by Giuseppe Zola, long-time friend, recruited Tamburini to occupy the chair of moral theology at the University of Pavia, where Zola taught Church History. Tamburini was also appointed Prefect of Studies at the Austro-Hungarian College, today Collegio Cairoli, and published numerous texts, both of theology and defense of the liberal Habsburg rule in Lombardy.

In 1786, Scipione Ricci invited him to the Diocesan Synod of Pistoia; many theses adopted by this synod aimed at a Jansenist reform of the Church, and were subsequently condemned in 1794 by Pius VI in the recurring bull Auctorem fidei. With the death of Emperor Joseph II in 1790, the turbulence of the French Revolution, led the new reactionary Austrian government to expel Tamburini from the University of Pavia in 1794. With the arrival of rule by Napoleon, he was rewarded "Knight of the Order of the Iron Crown", and in 1797, he was called there to teach a chair of moral philosophy and natural law. The following years were turbulent with changing administrations. This chair was suppressed in 1798, but restored in 1801, and kept by Tamburini till 1818, when he was appointed dean of the faculty of law. Tamburini died in Pavia on 14 March 1827.

== Selected Works ==
- Idea della Santa Sede (Pavia, 1784), in which he opposed papal infallibility, while maintaining its supremacy;
- Introduzione allo studio della filosofia (Milan, 1797);
- Lezioni di filosofia morale, e di naturale e sociale diritto (4 vols., Pavia, 1806–12);
- Elementa Juris Naturae (Milan, 1815);
- Cenni sulla perfettibilita dell'umana famiglia (Milan, 1823);
- La Storia generale dell'Inquisizione.
