= Torre de' Picenardi =

- Comune
- Comune di Torre de' Picenardi
- Coat of arms

- Location within Italy Location within Lombardy
- Coordinates: 45°9′N 10°17′E
- Country: Italy
- Region: Lombardy
- Province: Cremona (CR)

Government
  - Mayor: Mario Bazzani

Area
  - Total: 34.2 km^{2} (13.2 sq mi)

Population (31 December 2019)
  - Total: 2,061
  - Density: 60.3/km^{2} (156/sq mi)
- Time zone: UTC+1 (CET)
  - Summer (DST): UTC+2 (CEST)
- Postal code: 26038
- Dialing code: 0375
- Website: Official website

Torre de' Picenardi (Cremunés: Li Tùr) is a comune (municipality) in the Province of Cremona in the Italian region Lombardy, located about 90 kilometres (56 mi) southeast of Milan and about 20 kilometres (12 mi) east of Cremona.

Torre de' Picenardi borders the following municipalities: Ca' d'Andrea, Cappella de' Picenardi, Drizzona, Isola Dovarese, Pessina Cremonese, and Voltido.

== History ==
The ancient history of the village of Torre de' Picenardi is very fragmentary, with a few finds from prehistoric times related to the Copper Age, while artifacts already appear more abundant for the Roman period, with numerous finds now preserved at the archaeological museum in Piadena.

In 1984, in the vicinity of the village, on the border with the town of Isola Dovarese, the remains of a rustic villa from the Roman period dating from the 1st–2nd century AD were found, confirming the activity of the village, which was not coincidentally located a short distance from the Via Postumia that connected Genoa with Aquileia, crossing the entire Cremonese territory.

Medieval documents relating to the history of the municipality date back to the 13th century, and precisely in 1278 it was called Torre de' Malamberti in reference to the ancient Cremonese family of the same name that owned those lands before it was taken over by the Picenardi family, who are first testified to have been present in the territory in the following century, remaining there uninterruptedly until the 20th century.

In 1414, the condottiero Cabrino Fondulo led Emperor Sigismund of the Holy Roman Empire on a visit to the local castle, accompanied by the three contenders for the papacy, Gregory XII, Benedict XIII and John XXIII. In front of the castle of Torre de' Picenardi, the Count of Carmagnola was also blocked from daring to attack the imperial armies. Between 1426 and 1427, the village was sacked and occupied by the Venetians with 7,000 soldiers in tow, and again, the dramatic scene was repeated in 1509 and 1516.

In 1525, Antonio Maria Picenardi succeeded in acquiring the local castle in its entirety, which was sacked again in 1648 by troops of the Duchy of Modena, which, allied with the French, headed its armies against Spanish-occupied Cremona. Galeazzo Picenardi was captain of Cremona's urban militia during this same period, which is why his castle was further sacked in 1648 by Agostino da Piadena, a local bandit.

With the Picenardi obtaining the title of marquis in 1714, the complete renovation of the castle began, which would aim to transform the entire complex into a modern villa di delizia. In 1710, meanwhile, the Picenardi started the reconstruction of the local parish church, with the work lasting until 1724.

Between the 18th and 19th centuries, in the settlement, the main owners besides the Picenardi were the noble families of the Crotti counts (mainly in the hamlet and the castle of San Lorenzo) and the Soresina Vidoni princes, as well as the Melzi d'Eryl (in the hamlet of Pozzo Baronzio) and the Resta Pallavicino marquises (Ca de' Caggi). Also present were the fathers of the monastery of San Salvatore, whose property, however, was forfeited by the Picenardi with the suppression of religious orders in the late 18th century.

In 1866, after the Battle of Custoza, first a contingent and then the headquarters of the Italian army under the command of General La Marmora were stationed at the local castle.

On 1 January 1868, the municipalities of Cà de' Caggi, Pozzo Baronzio, San Lorenzo de' Picenardi and Torre d'Angiolini were aggregated into the municipality of Torre de' Malamberti; at the same time, the municipality assumed the new name of Torre de' Picenardi.

On 1 January 2019, it incorporated the municipality of Ca' d'Andrea, which was abolished following the referendum of 10 June 2018.

== Monuments and places of interest ==
- Villa Sommi Picenardi, built in the 19th century on a pre-existing 13th-century castle, was the patrician residence of the Picenardi family, who had their fiefdom here.
- Parish church of Sant'Ambrogio
- Castle of San Lorenzo

== Anthropological geography ==
In addition to Torre de' Picenardi itself, the municipality consists of a number of hamlets, almost all of which have their own history so much so that, until the Risorgimento, the current municipal territory was divided into 5 parishes and as many as 12 municipalities:

- Cà de' Caggi
- Canove de' Biazzi
- Pozzo Baronzio
- San Lorenzo de' Picenardi
- Ca' d'Andrea
- Breda Guazzona
- Brolpasino
- Canova
- Casanova d'Offredi
- Fossa Guazzona
- Galizia
- Pieve San Maurizio
- Ronca de' Golferami
