= Voltido =

Voltido Vultéed (Lombard)
- Comune
- Comune di Voltido
- Coat of arms

- Location within Italy Location within Lombardy
- Coordinates: 45°7′N 10°16′E
- Country: Italy
- Region: Lombardy
- Province: Cremona (CR)

Government
  - Mayor: Fabio Valenti

Area
  - Total: 12.3 km^{2} (4.7 sq mi)

Population (Dec. 2004)
  - Total: 436
  - Density: 35.4/km^{2} (91.8/sq mi)
- Time zone: UTC+1 (CET)
  - Summer (DST): UTC+2 (CEST)
- Postal code: 26030
- Website: Official website

Voltido (Cremunés: Vultéed) is a comune (municipality) in the Province of Cremona in the Italian region Lombardy, located about 90 kilometres (56 mi) southeast of Milan and about 20 kilometres (12 mi) east of Cremona.

Voltido borders the following municipalities: Ca' d'Andrea, Drizzona, Piadena, San Martino del Lago, Solarolo Rainerio, Torre de' Picenardi.
