= Canneto sull'Oglio =

- Comune
- Comune di Canneto sull'Oglio
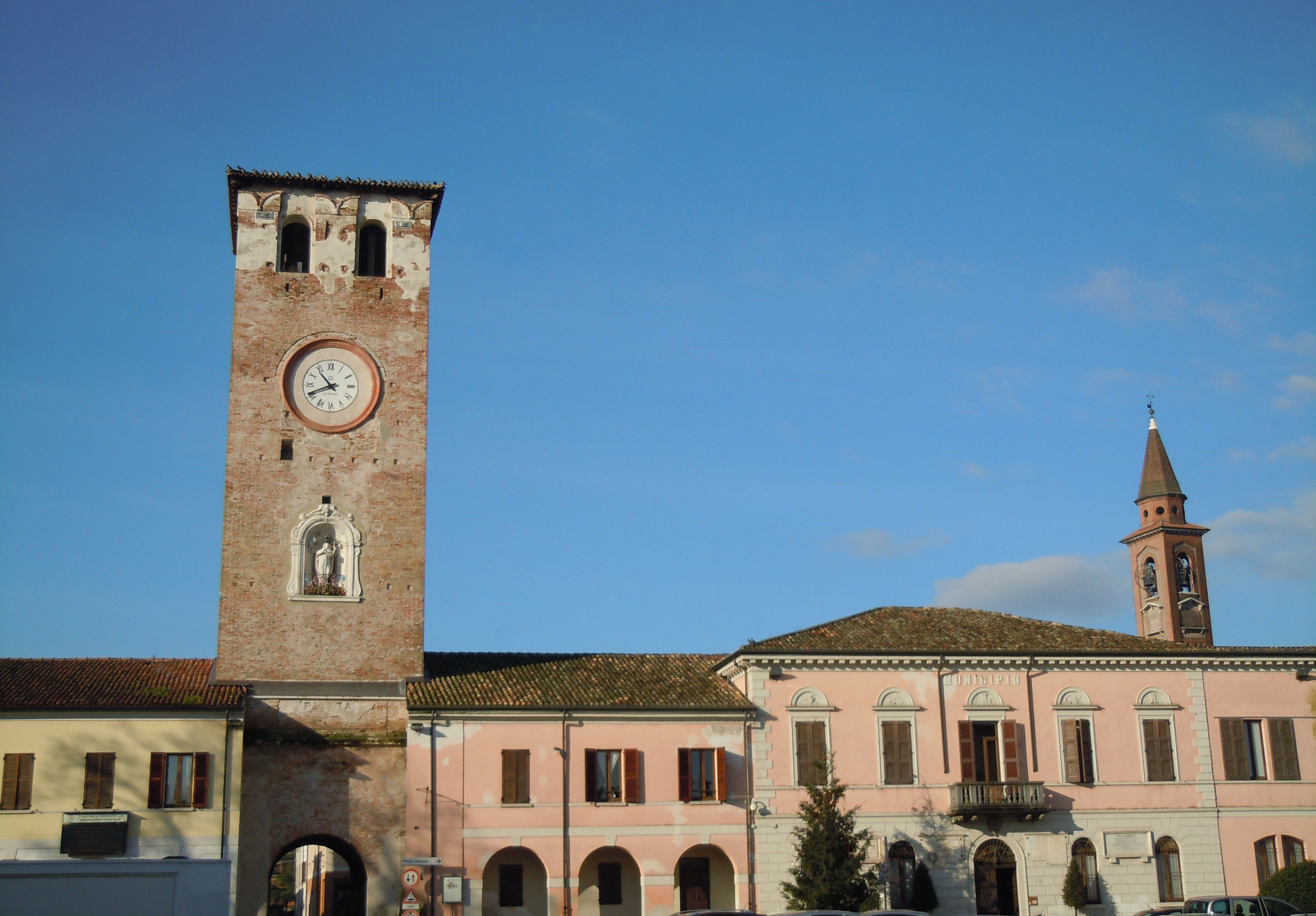
- Piazza Matteotti.

- Coat of arms

- Location within Italy Location within Lombardy
- Coordinates: 45°9′N 10°23′E
- Country: Italy
- Region: Lombardy
- Province: Mantua (MN)
- Frazioni: Bizzolano, Runate, Carzaghetto

Government
  - Mayor: Nicolò Ficicchia (Civic list)

Area
  - Total: 25.9 km^{2} (10.0 sq mi)
- Elevation: 34 m (112 ft)

Population (31 March 2021)
  - Total: 4,222
  - Density: 163/km^{2} (422/sq mi)
- Demonym: Cannetesi
- Time zone: UTC+1 (CET)
  - Summer (DST): UTC+2 (CEST)
- Postal code: 46013
- Dialing code: 0673
- ISTAT code: 020008
- Website: Official website

Canneto sull'Oglio (Upper Mantovano: Cané) is a comune (municipality) in the Province of Mantua in the Italian region Lombardy, located about 100 kilometres (62 mi) southeast of Milan and about 35 kilometres (22 mi) west of Mantua.

Canneto sull'Oglio borders the following municipalities: Acquanegra sul Chiese, Asola, Calvatone, Casalromano, Drizzona, Isola Dovarese, Piadena.

The Michelin three-starred restaurant Dal Pescatore, run by chef Nadia Santini, is in the town.

== Etymology ==
The name Canneto comes from the Latin canna palustre (common reed), from which is derived the Latin word cannetum (reed field), and thence the Italian canneto. "sull'Oglio" refers to its location on the Oglio river.

== Economy ==
The town's main activity is the nursery production of broadleaf plants, for which much of the municipal farmland is devoted.

Nursery production as early as the last decade of the 19th century occupied the left bank of the Oglio River for about 3 km, in soils consisting of very fine or mixed sands and in the floodplain of the nearby Fiume Chiese. These nurseries occupied a total of more than 120 hectares belonging to about 50 owners who, in addition to conducting the land directly, ceded part of it to tenant farmers and sharecroppers.

Currently in Canneto sull'Oglio and neighboring municipalities, the "Distretto Vivaistico Cannetese" has come into being, which, on land extending about 2,500 hectares, produces an annual turnover of around 150 million euros.

In the last decades of the 20th century Canneto sull'Oglio was known for being home to the toy industrial district. Among other companies until the 2000s was Furga, a factory that initially produced ceramics, which was reconverted to the production of dolls. Of that production it became an international brand, until it was absorbed by Grazioli and later ceased operations in 2005.

This industrial past is evidenced by the "Giulio Superti Furga Toy Collection" established in 1984 and preserved in rooms in the Municipal Palace. Following subsequent further donations and loans, the collection was exhibited since 1994 in the Civic Museum of Canneto sull`Oglio.

On September 25, 2021, a mini hydroelectric plant wanted by the Garda Chiese Land Reclamation Consortium began to produce electricity, exploiting the existing dislvelling in the water system that flows into the bed of the Oglio River. The work also has historical significance in that it reactivated an old mill that was used from 1898 to produce power, including for public lighting, based on the design and impetus of Hermann Einstein, father of Albert Einstein.

== Infrastructure and transportation ==
Canneto sull'Oglio station, located along the Brescia-Parma railroad, is served by regional trains operated by Trenord and cadenced on an hourly basis as part of the service contract signed with the Lombardy Region.
