= Nadia Santini =

Italian chef (1954–2026)

- Born: 19 July 1954; San Pietro Mussolino, Italy
- Died: 2 November 2026 (aged 72)
- Culinary career
- Cooking style: Italian cuisine
- Rating
- Michelin stars
- Current restaurant
- Dal Pescatore
- Television show
- Three Stars (documentary)

Nadia Santini (19 July 1954 – 2 November 2026) was an Italian chef, best known for her restaurant Dal Pescatore, in Canneto sull'Oglio, Lombardy, which has held three Michelin stars since 1996. She was the first Italian woman to be awarded the coveted three stars.

== Early life and career ==
Santini was taught to cook at a young age by her future husband's great-grandmother, Teresa. She has a cooking philosophy around the idea of a small restaurant, saying "I think it is impossible for a woman to run a kitchen that serves 100 people. I can't give my heart to a dish if I am cooking for more than 30."

Her restaurant Dal Pescatore is located in the comune of Canneto sull'Oglio in Lombardy, Italy. The restaurant is an extended trattoria, and was originally opened by Santini's husband's great-grandparents in the 1910s. Nadia took over the running of the restaurant alongside her husband in 1974. In 1996, the restaurant was awarded three Michelin stars, with Santini becoming the first female Italian chef to earn that level of accolade.

In 2010, German filmmaker Lutz Hachmeister created a television documentary called Three Stars, in which Santini starred amongst other chefs from Michelin-starred restaurants. Her appearance in the documentary stood out, being described by critics as a "radiant personality and gentle, Old World approach to the nurturing of recipes, colleagues, and clientele provide the counterpoint to frenetic, confrontational kitchens run by scientist-chefs."

Santini was highly regarded by other chefs, including French chef Anne-Sophie Pic who described her as "extraordinary" and an inspiration, and British chef Angela Hartnett has described Santini as one of her "heroes".

2013 saw Nadia being christened 2013 Veuve Clicquot World's Best Female chef from The World's 50 Best Restaurants by Restaurant magazine.

== Personal life and death ==
Santini was married to Antonio, who works in her restaurant, but in reception rather than the kitchen. They met whilst studying political science at the University of Milan.

Santini died on 2 November 2026, aged 72.
