= Cappella de' Picenardi =

- Comune
- Comune di Cappella de' Picenardi
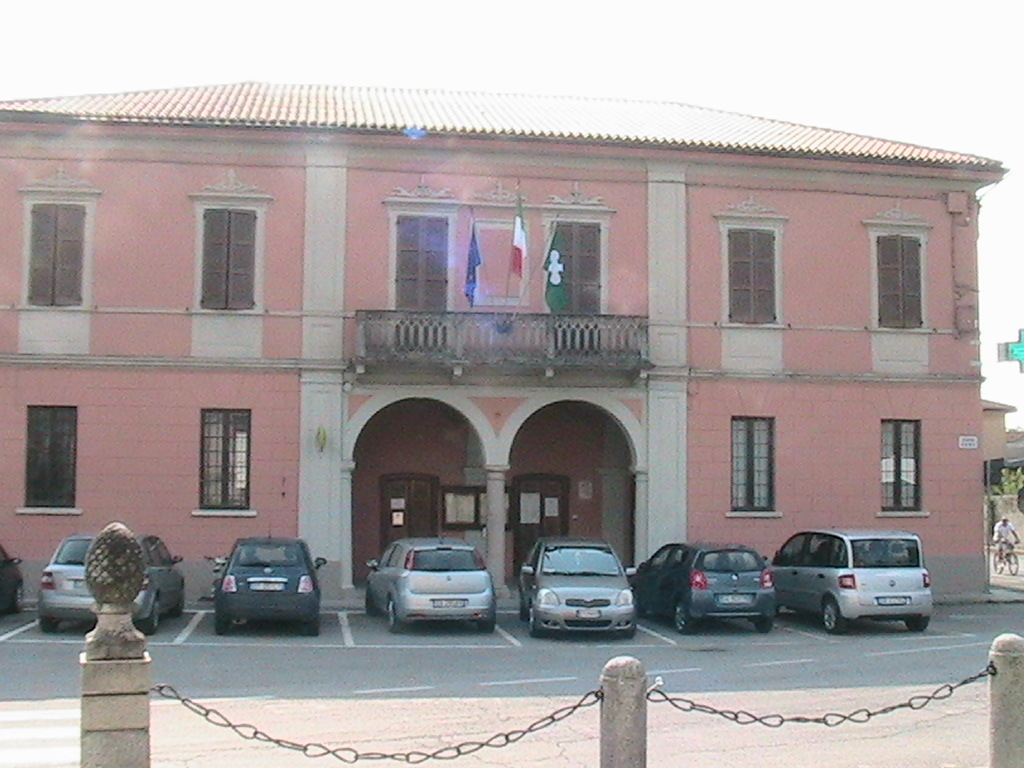
- Town hall

- Coat of arms

- Location within Italy Location within Lombardy
- Coordinates: 45°10′N 10°14′E
- Country: Italy
- Region: Lombardy
- Province: Cremona (CR)

Government
  - Mayor: Roberto Poli

Area
  - Total: 14.2 km^{2} (5.5 sq mi)
- Elevation: 42 m (138 ft)

Population (31 May 2017)
  - Total: 417
  - Density: 29.4/km^{2} (76.1/sq mi)
- Demonym: Cappellini
- Time zone: UTC+1 (CET)
  - Summer (DST): UTC+2 (CEST)
- Postal code: 26030
- Dialing code: 0372
- Website: Official website

Cappella de' Picenardi (Cremunés: La Capéla) is a comune (municipality) in the Province of Cremona in the Italian region Lombardy, located about 90 kilometres (56 mi) southeast of Milan and about 15 kilometres (9 mi) east of Cremona.

One of the main churches is that of San Pancrazio Martire.

Cappella de' Picenardi borders the following municipalities: Ca' d'Andrea, Cicognolo, Derovere, Pescarolo ed Uniti, Pessina Cremonese, Pieve San Giacomo, Torre de' Picenardi.
