= Ca' d'Andrea =

- Comune
- Comune di Ca' d'Andrea
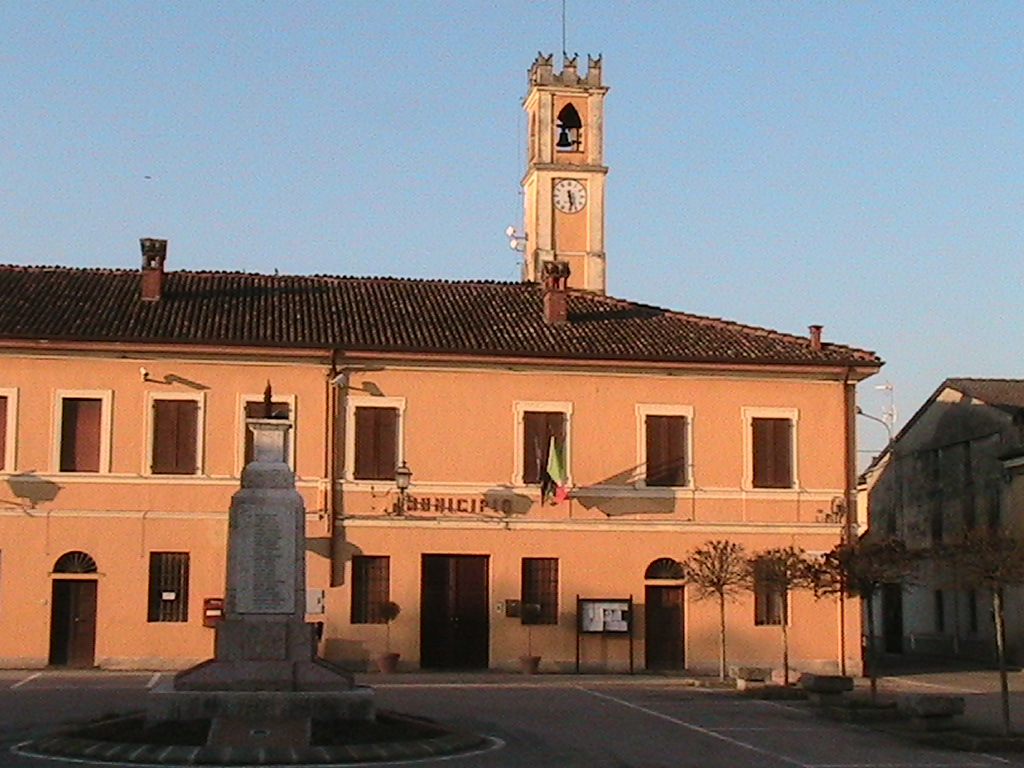
- Town hall.

- Coat of arms

- Location within Italy Location within Lombardy
- Coordinates: 45°7′N 10°16′E
- Country: Italy
- Region: Lombardy
- Province: Cremona (CR)

Government
  - Mayor: Franco Potabili Bertani

Area
  - Total: 17.11 km^{2} (6.61 sq mi)
- Elevation: 34 m (112 ft)

Population (April 30, 2017)
  - Total: 432
  - Density: 25.2/km^{2} (65.4/sq mi)
- Demonym: Andreani
- Time zone: UTC+1 (CET)
  - Summer (DST): UTC+2 (CEST)
- Postal code: 26030
- Dialing code: 0375
- Website: Official website

Ca' d'Andrea is a comune (municipality) in the Province of Cremona in the Italian region Lombardy, located about 90 kilometres (56 mi) southeast of Milan and about 20 kilometres (12 mi) east of Cremona.

Ca' d'Andrea borders the following municipalities: Cappella de' Picenardi, Cingia de' Botti, Derovere, San Martino del Lago, Torre de' Picenardi, Voltido.

== History ==
On January 1, 1868, the municipalities of Brolpasino, Breda Guazzona, Casanova d'Offredi, Fossa Guazzona, Pieve San Maurizio and Ronca de' Golferami were aggregated into the municipality of Cà d'Andrea.

On June 10, 2018, the inhabitants in a referendum voted to merge by incorporation with the municipality of Torre de' Picenardi, which became effective on January 1, 2019.
