= Sant'Ambrogio, Gabbioneta-Binanuova =

Church in Gabbioneta-Binanuova, Italy

Coordinates: 45.2170°N 10.2228°E

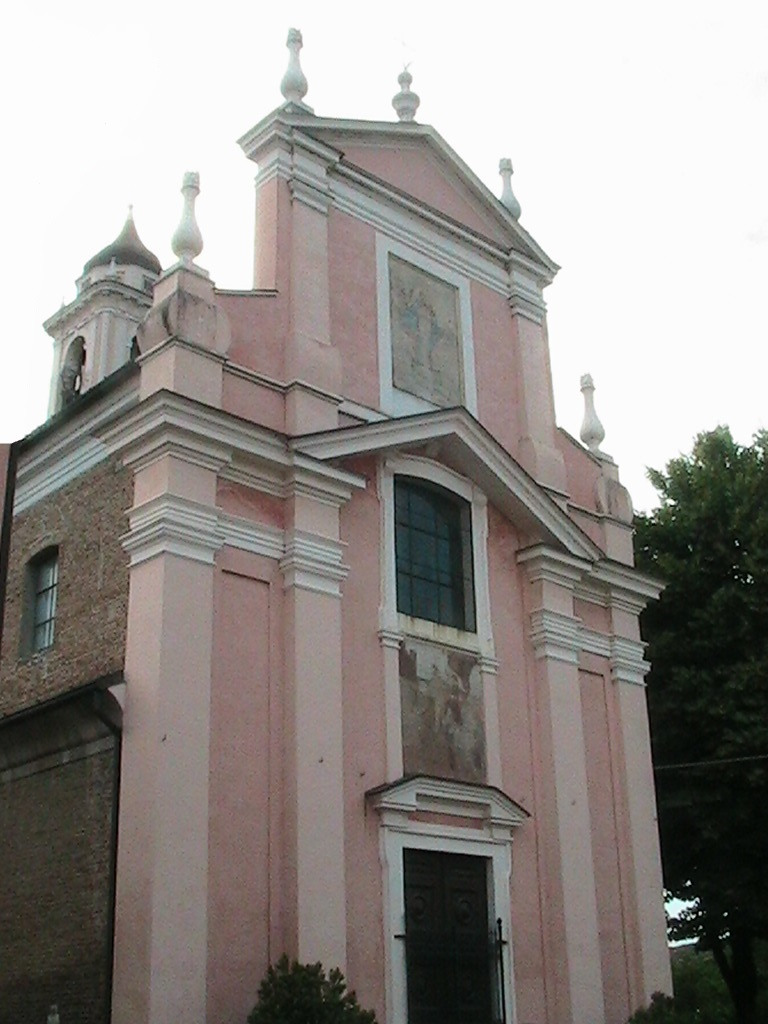
Chiesa prepositurale di Sant'Ambrogio

Sant'Ambrogio Vescovo is a Baroque-style, Roman Catholic church located on Via Libertà #2 in the town of Gabbioneta-Binanuova in the province of Cremona, region of Lombardy, Italy.

== History ==
The single nave structure was erected in the late 17th-century atop an earlier structure. The facade was not completed until 1710. It has two frescoes at the entrance by Eliodoro Coccoli: St Ambrosius enters Milan and the Immaculate Conception.

The interiors still retain the 17th-century altars, with marble bases and polychrome faux-marble, dedicated to the Madonna, the Sacred Heart, and containing altarpieces depicting Saint Antony of Padua and a Deposition with St Roch. The Organ was made by the Amati family in 1860. The church gained from the patronage of the Pallavicino family.
