= Jacopo Bellini =

Italian painter (c. 1400 – c. 1470)

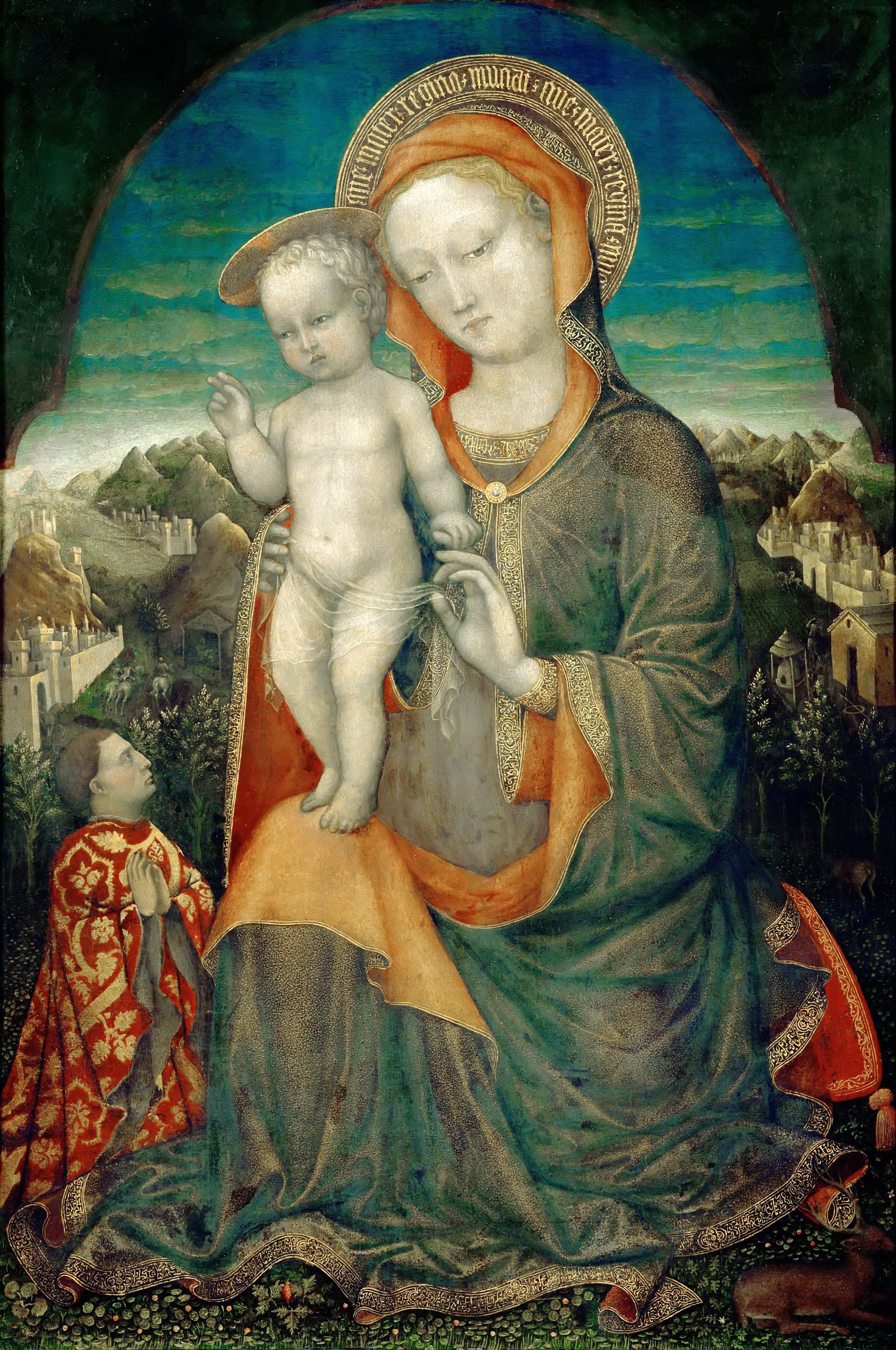
Virgin of Humility, adored by a prince of the House of Este, 1440. Notice the Pseudo-Kufic mantle hem. Louvre Museum.

Jacopo Bellini (c. 1400 – c. 1470) was one of the founders of the Renaissance style of painting in Venice and northern Italy. His sons Gentile and Giovanni Bellini, and his son-in-law Andrea Mantegna, were also famous painters.

Few of Bellini's paintings still exist, but his surviving sketch-books (one in the British Museum and one in the Louvre) show an interest in landscape and elaborate architectural design and are his most important legacy. His surviving works show how he accommodated linear perspective to the decorative patterns and rich colours of Venetian painting.

== Biography ==
Born in Venice, Jacopo had probably been a pupil of Gentile da Fabriano, who was then in Venice. In 1411–1412, he was in Foligno, where with Gentile, he worked at the Palazzo Trinci frescoes. In 1423 Bellini was in Florence, where he knew the new works by Brunelleschi, Donatello, Masolino da Panicale and Masaccio. In 1424, he opened a workshop in Venice, which he ran right up until his death, and which trained his sons and other artists.

Many of his greatest works, including the enormous Crucifixion in the cathedral of Verona (1436), have disappeared. From c. 1430 is the panel with Madonna and Child, in the Accademia Carrara, once attributed to Gentile da Fabriano. In 1441, at Ferrara, where he was at the service of Leonello d'Este together with Leon Battista Alberti, he executed a portrait of that Marquess, now lost. Of this period survives the Madonna dell'Umiltà, probably commissioned by one of the brothers of Leonello.

The influence from Masolino da Panicale towards more modern, early Renaissance themes is visible in the Madonna with Child (dated 1448) in the Pinacoteca di Brera: for the first time, perspective is present and the figures are more monumental. Later, he contributed with works now lost to the Venetian churches of San Giovanni Evangelista (1452) and St. Mark (1466). From 1459 is a Madonna with Blessing Child in the Gallerie dell'Accademia.

Later, he sojourned in Padua, where he trained a young Andrea Mantegna in perspective and classicist themes and where, in 1460, he finished a portrait of Erasmo Gattamelata, now lost. Of his late phase, a ruined Crucifix in the Museum of Verona and an Annunciation in the church of Sant'Alessandro of Brescia remain.

Giovanni Fontana showed Bellini a treatise on perspective.

== Selected works ==
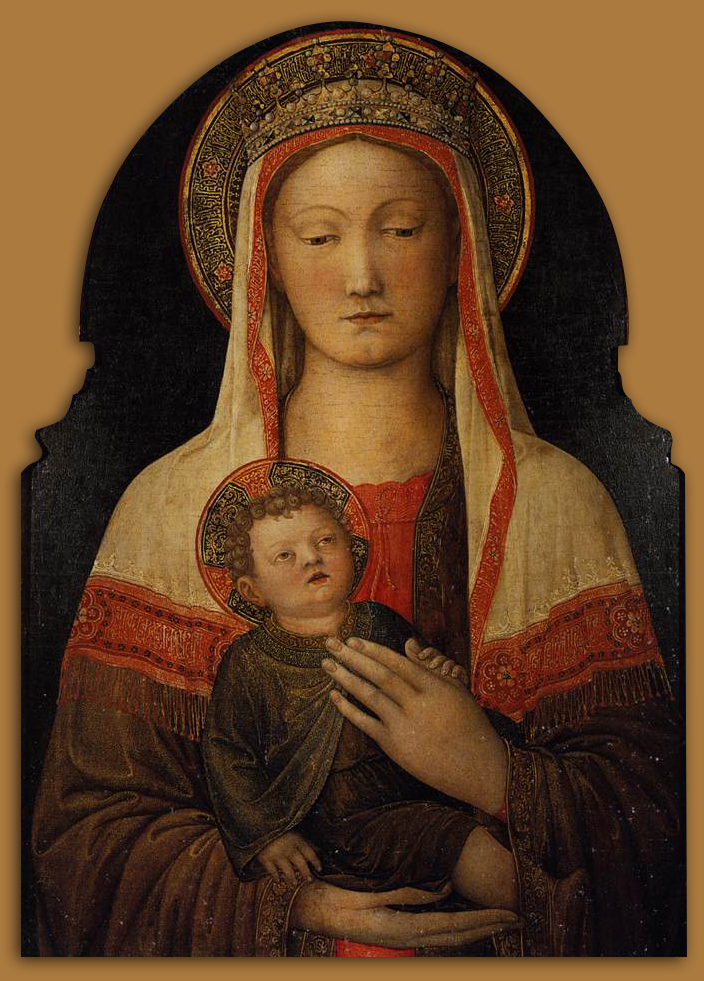
Madonna and Child (1450), tempera on wood, 111 x 62 cm, Uffizi, Florence

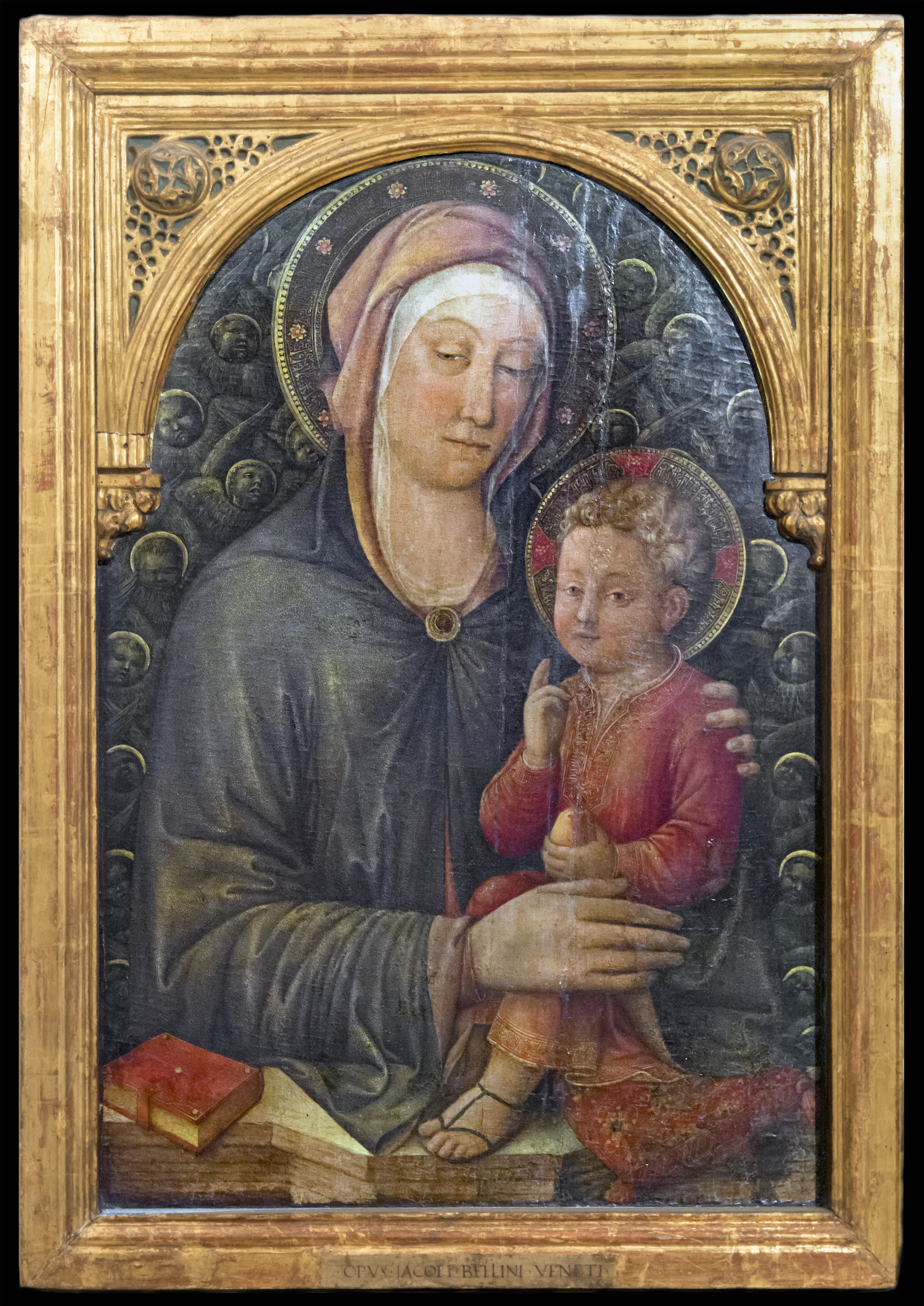
Madonna and Child Blessing (c.1455), tempera on wood, 94 x 66 cm, Gallerie dell'Accademia, Venice

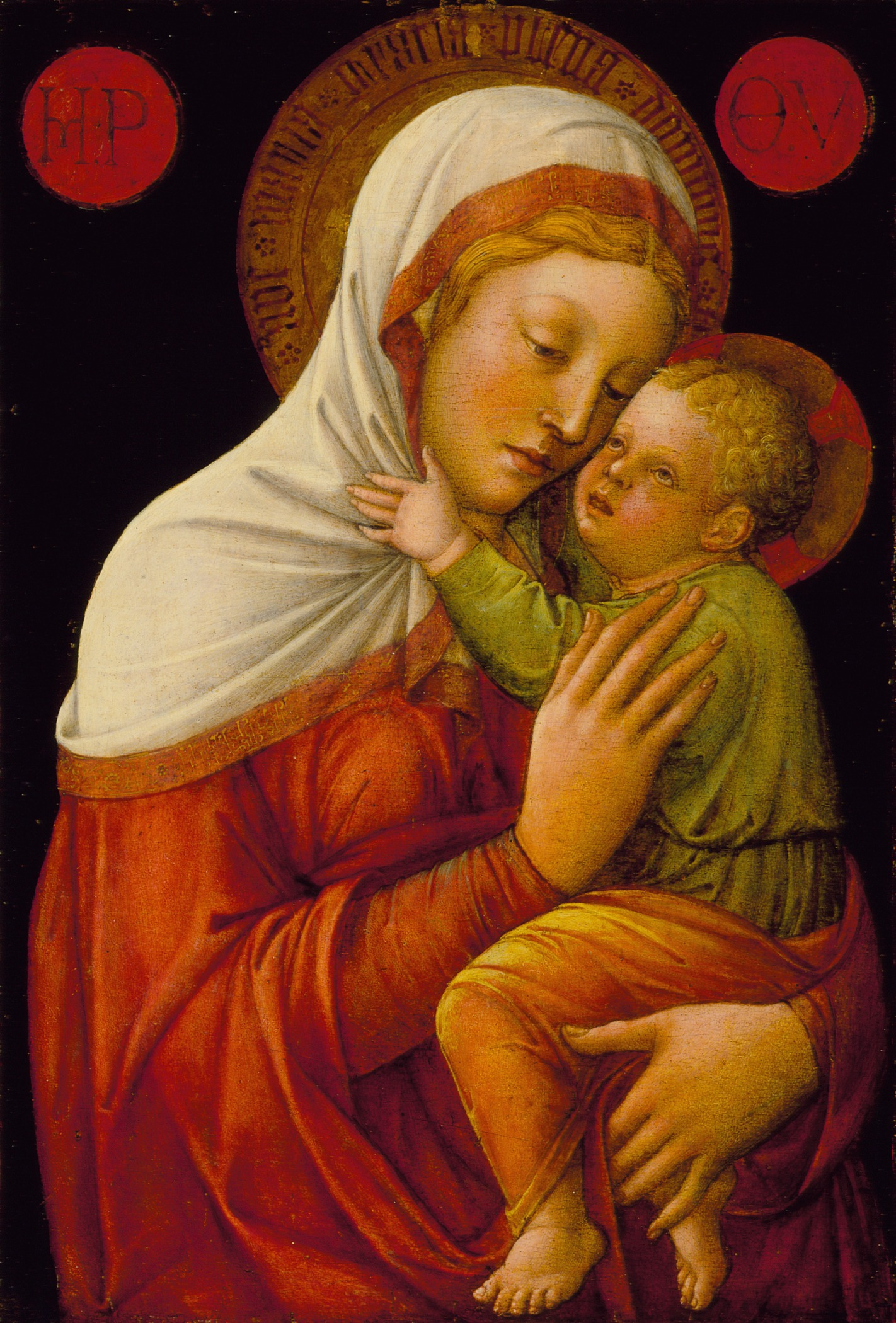
Madonna With Child (c. 1465), oil on panel, 69.2 x 46.9 cm, Los Angeles County Museum of Art

== Sources ==
- C. Eisler, The genius of Jacopo Bellini: the complete paintings and drawings (London, The British Museum Press, 1989)
- Chisholm, Hugh, ed. (1911). "Bellini" . Encyclopædia Britannica. Vol. 3 (11th ed.). Cambridge University Press.
