= Casalromano =

Casalromano Casarima (Emilian)
- Comune
- Comune di Casalromano
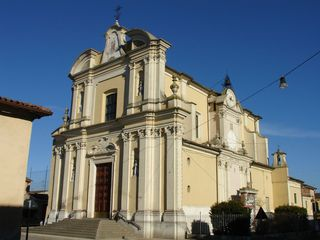

- Location within Italy Location within Lombardy
- Coordinates: 45°12′N 10°22′E
- Country: Italy
- Region: Lombardy
- Province: Province of Mantua (MN)
- Frazioni: Fontanella Grazioli

Area
  - Total: 11.9 km^{2} (4.6 sq mi)

Population (Dec. 2004)
  - Total: 1,568
  - Density: 132/km^{2} (341/sq mi)
- Time zone: UTC+1 (CET)
  - Summer (DST): UTC+2 (CEST)
- Postal code: 46040
- Dialing code: 0376
- Website: Official website

Casalromano (Upper Mantovano: Casarima) is a comune (municipality) in the Province of Mantua in the Italian region Lombardy, located about 100 kilometres (62 mi) southeast of Milan and about 35 kilometres (22 mi) west of Mantua. As of 31 December 2004, it had a population of 1,568 and an area of 11.9 square kilometres (4.6 mi^{2}).

The municipality of Casalromano contains the frazione (subdivision) Fontanella Grazioli.

Casalromano borders the following municipalities: Asola, Canneto sull'Oglio, Fiesse, Isola Dovarese, Volongo.

== Demographic evolution ==
Historical population

Year	Pop.	±%
1861	1,042	—
1871	1,084	+4.0%
1881	1,122	+3.5%
1901	1,275	+13.6%
1911	1,491	+16.9%

Year	Pop.	±%
1921	1,517	+1.7%
1931	1,540	+1.5%
1936	1,493	−3.1%
1951	1,487	−0.4%
1961	1,290	−13.2%

Year	Pop.	±%
1971	1,119	−13.3%
1981	1,229	+9.8%
1991	1,276	+3.8%
2001	1,468	+15.0%

Source: Data from ISTAT
