= Pescarolo ed Uniti =

- Comune
- Comune di Pescarolo ed Uniti
- Location within Italy Location within Lombardy
- Coordinates: 45°12′N 10°11′E
- Country: Italy
- Region: Lombardy
- Province: Province of Cremona (CR)

Area
  - Total: 16.6 km^{2} (6.4 sq mi)

Population (Dec. 2004)
  - Total: 1,520
  - Density: 91.6/km^{2} (237/sq mi)
- Time zone: UTC+1 (CET)
  - Summer (DST): UTC+2 (CEST)
- Postal code: 26033
- Dialing code: 0372

Pescarolo ed Uniti (Cremunés: Pescaról) is a comune (municipality) in the Province of Cremona in the Italian region Lombardy, located about 90 kilometres (56 mi) southeast of Milan and about 14 kilometres (9 mi) northeast of Cremona. As of 31 December 2004, it had a population of 1,520 and an area of 16.6 square kilometres (6.4 mi^{2}).

Pescarolo ed Uniti borders the following municipalities: Cappella de' Picenardi, Cicognolo, Gabbioneta-Binanuova, Grontardo, Pessina Cremonese, Vescovato.

== Demographic evolution ==
Historical population

Year	Pop.	±%
1861	2,429	—
1871	2,558	+5.3%
1881	2,438	−4.7%
1901	2,552	+4.7%
1911	2,587	+1.4%

Year	Pop.	±%
1921	2,482	−4.1%
1931	2,694	+8.5%
1936	2,681	−0.5%
1951	2,657	−0.9%
1961	2,169	−18.4%

Year	Pop.	±%
1971	1,671	−23.0%
1981	1,485	−11.1%
1991	1,437	−3.2%
2001	1,485	+3.3%

Source: Data from ISTAT
