= Giuseppe Tortelli =

Italian painter

Giuseppe Tortelli (1662–circa 1738) was an Italian painter of the late Baroque period, active in Brescia.

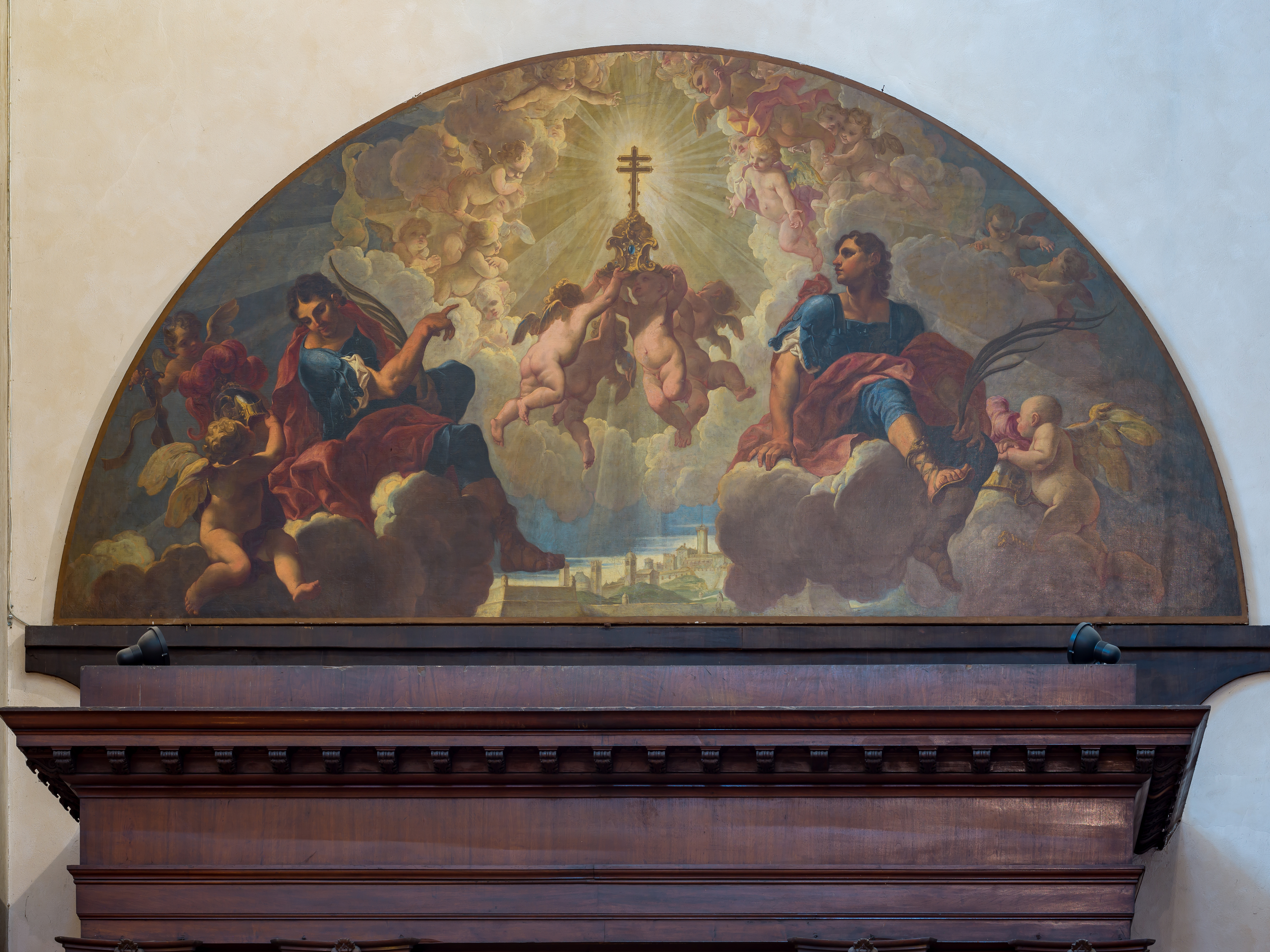
Oil painting of the Saints Faustinus and Jovita by Giuseppe Tortelli in the Cathedral Duomo nuovo of Brescia.

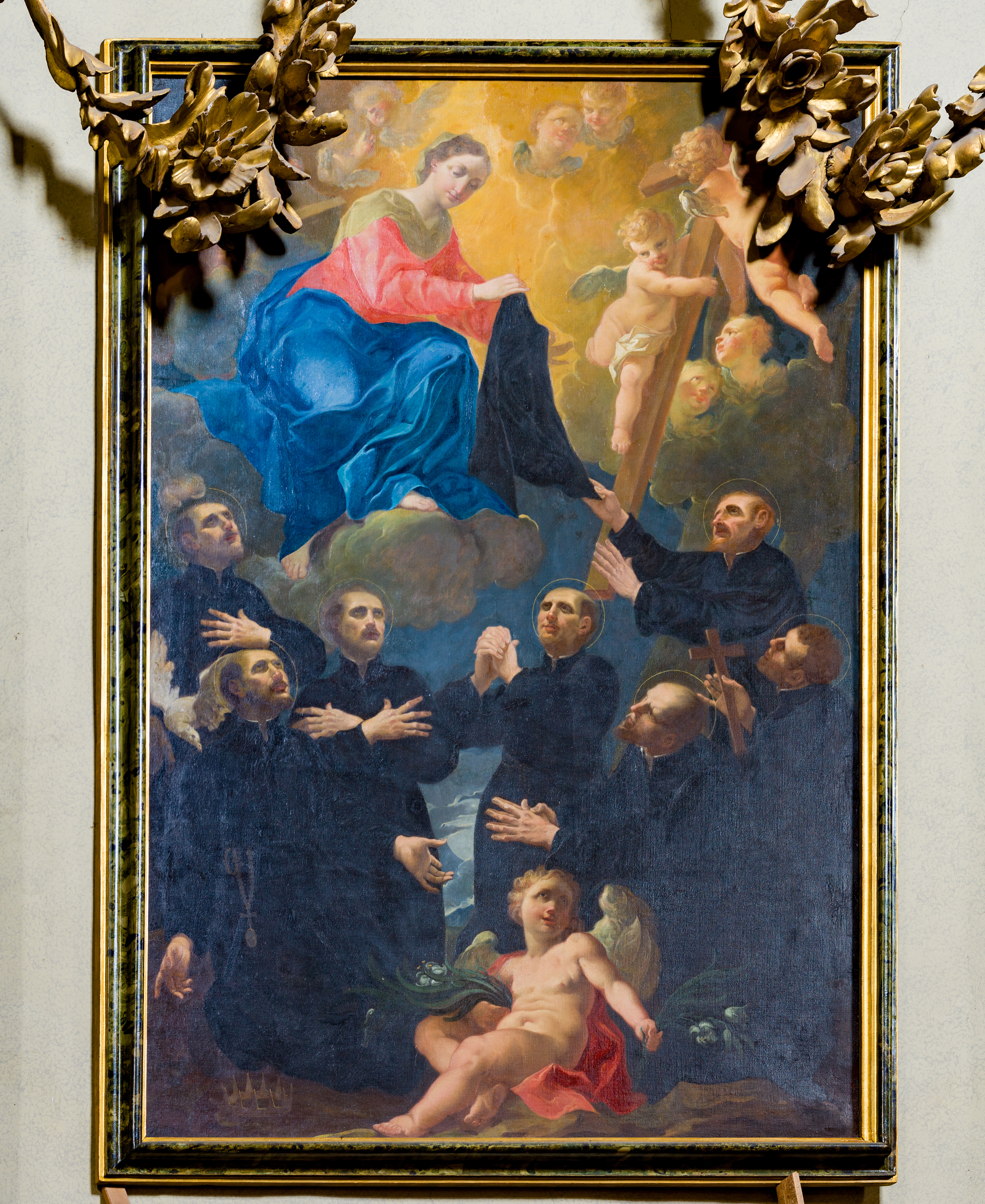
The Virgin and the friars founders of the Servite Order by Giuseppe Tortelli in the Sant'Alessandro church in Brescia.

== Biography ==
He received a broad education in writing and philosophy. He traveled to Naples to observe masters there, then to Venice.

In 1709, he painted two large canvases, depicting the Assumption of Mary and Saints Faustino and Giovita in Adoration of the Cross for the Duomo Vecchio, but now in Duomo Nuovo of Brescia. Also in 1709, he lost a commission to Andrea Celesti to paint for the Duomo of Verolanuova. He painted a San Liborio (1711) for the Duomo Vecchio, also transferred to the Duomo Nuovo. He painted three scenes of the Passion of Christ (1712) for a via cruces in the chapel of the Santissimi Sacramento of Sant'Agata in Brescia; a Madonna con St Alberto Carmelitano (1721) for the church of the Carmine; a St Matthew and the Angel (1726) for Santa Maria della Carità; an altarpiece of Christ appears to Saints Pellegrino Laziosi, and Giuliano Confalonieri (1735) for Sant'Alessandro; an altarpiece depicting Santi Nicola da Bari, Sebastiano, e Rocco (1737) for the sacristy of the parish of Orzivecchi; an altarpiece of Martyrdon of St Erasmus (1738) for San Zeno al Foro; and a Holy Trinity (1738) for San Francesco. In Brescia in the church of San Pietro in Oliveto, the altarpiece in the second altar on the left, depicting St John of the Cross in Contemplation, is attributed to him. he painted a series of eight Saints for the Oratory of the Disciplini, Ostiano, province of Cremona.

Giuseppe Zola was one of his pupils.

== See Also ==
- Angelo Maria Querini
- Pompeo Batoni
- Jacopo Zoboli
