= Cicognolo =

Cicognolo Sigugnól (Lombard)
- Comune
- Comune di Cicognolo
- Location within Italy Location within Lombardy
- Coordinates: 45°10′N 10°12′E
- Country: Italy
- Region: Lombardy
- Province: Province of Cremona (CR)

Area
  - Total: 7.0 km^{2} (2.7 sq mi)

Population (Dec. 2012)
  - Total: 961
  - Density: 140/km^{2} (360/sq mi)
- Time zone: UTC+1 (CET)
  - Summer (DST): UTC+2 (CEST)
- Postal code: 26030
- Dialing code: 0372

Cicognolo (Cremunés: Sigugnól) is a comune (municipality) in the Province of Cremona in the Italian region Lombardy, located about 90 kilometres (56 mi) southeast of Milan and about 14 kilometres (9 mi) northeast of Cremona. As of 31 December 2012, it had a population of 961 and an area of 7.0 square kilometres (2.7 mi^{2}).

Cicognolo borders the following municipalities: Cappella de' Picenardi, Pescarolo ed Uniti, Pieve San Giacomo, Vescovato.

== Demographic evolution ==
Historical population

Year	Pop.	±%
1861	1,019	—
1871	1,060	+4.0%
1881	961	−9.3%
1901	992	+3.2%
1911	1,051	+5.9%

Year	Pop.	±%
1921	1,065	+1.3%
1931	1,082	+1.6%
1936	1,167	+7.9%
1951	1,160	−0.6%
1961	963	−17.0%

Year	Pop.	±%
1971	798	−17.1%
1981	810	+1.5%
1991	830	+2.5%
2001	850	+2.4%

Source: Data from ISTAT
