= San Michele Arcangelo, Ostiano =

Catholic church in Ostiano, Lombardy, Italy

Coordinates: 45.2211°N 10.2490°E

Photo of the church

San Michele Arcangelo is a Roman Catholic parish church located on in the town of Ostiano in the province of Cremona, region of Lombardy, Italy.

== History ==
A church was begun at the end of the 16th century, at the site of a church once attached to the Abbey of Leno. The church, large for its community, had 5 chapels on each side. Six of them have polychrome marble altars today. Among the artworks in the church are large 18th-century canvases depicting the Defeat of the Rebel Angels, the Liberation of St Peter from Jail, and the Glory of St Joseph by Giuseppe Tortelli. An altarpiece dedicated to San Gaudenzio has a picture of the town. Another altarpiece depicts the Dispute of the Holy Sacrament with the Virgin in Glory with Saints Gemiano and John the Baptist by Andrea Mainardi.
