= Derovere =

Derovere Drùver (Lombard)
- Comune
- Comune di Derovere
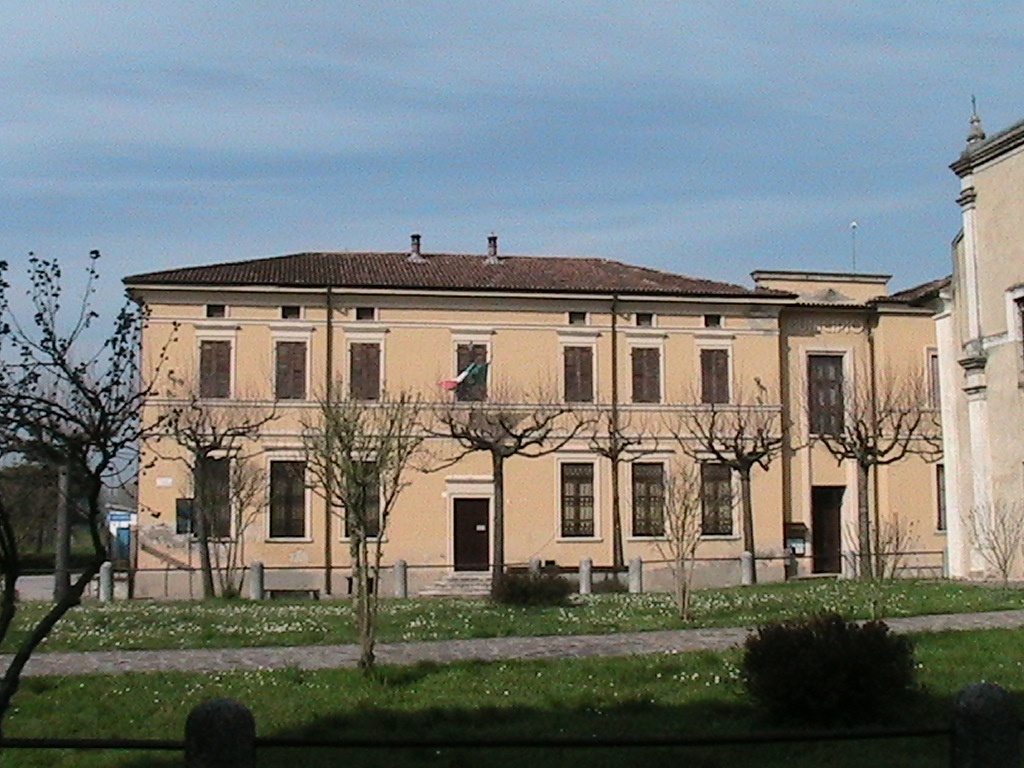

- Location within Italy Location within Lombardy
- Coordinates: 45°7′N 10°15′E
- Country: Italy
- Region: Lombardy
- Province: Cremona (CR)

Government
  - Mayor: Mauro Busseti

Area
  - Total: 9.9 km^{2} (3.8 sq mi)
- Elevation: 36 m (118 ft)

Population (31 March 2024)
  - Total: 278
  - Density: 28/km^{2} (73/sq mi)
- Demonym: Deroveresi
- Time zone: UTC+1 (CET)
  - Summer (DST): UTC+2 (CEST)
- Postal code: 26040
- Dialing code: 0372

Derovere (Cremunés: Drùver) is a comune (municipality) in the Province of Cremona in the Italian region Lombardy, located about 90 kilometres (56 mi) southeast of Milan and about 15 kilometres (9 mi) east of Cremona.

Derovere borders the following municipalities: Ca' d'Andrea, Cappella de' Picenardi, Cella Dati, Cingia de' Botti, Pieve San Giacomo.
