= San Pancrazio, Cappella de' Picenardi =

Church in Cappella de' Picenardi, Italy

San Pancrazio Martire is a Roman Catholic parish church located on Via Cavour #4 in the town of Cappella de' Picenardi in the province of Cremona, region of Lombardy, Italy.

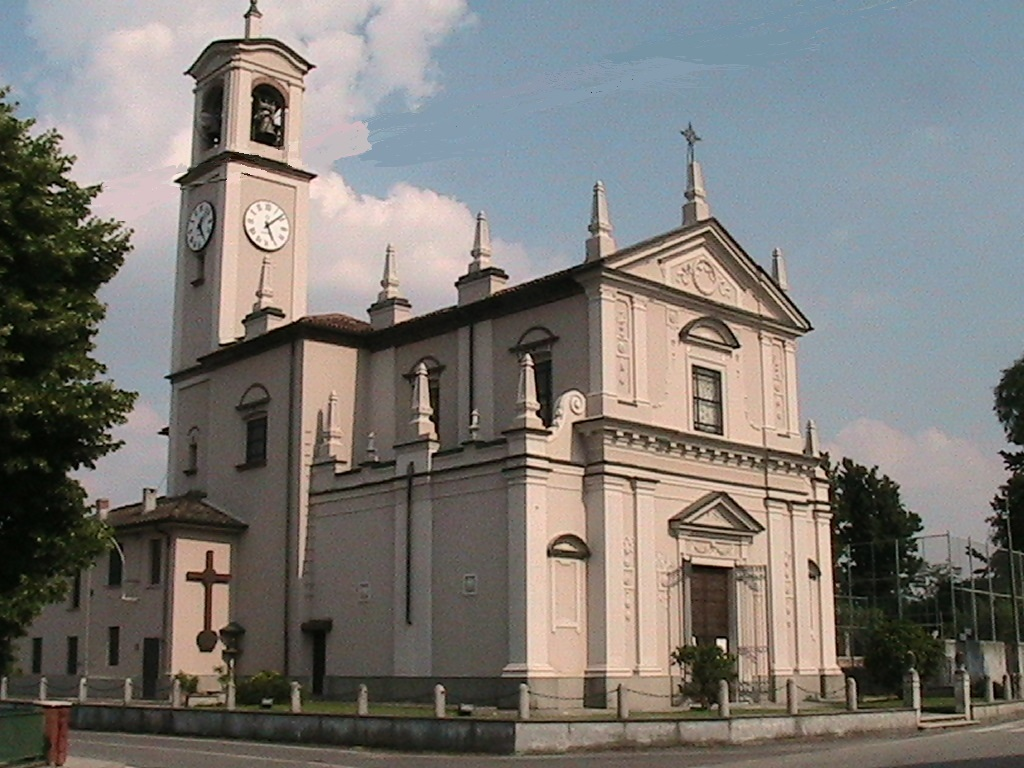
Facade with belltower

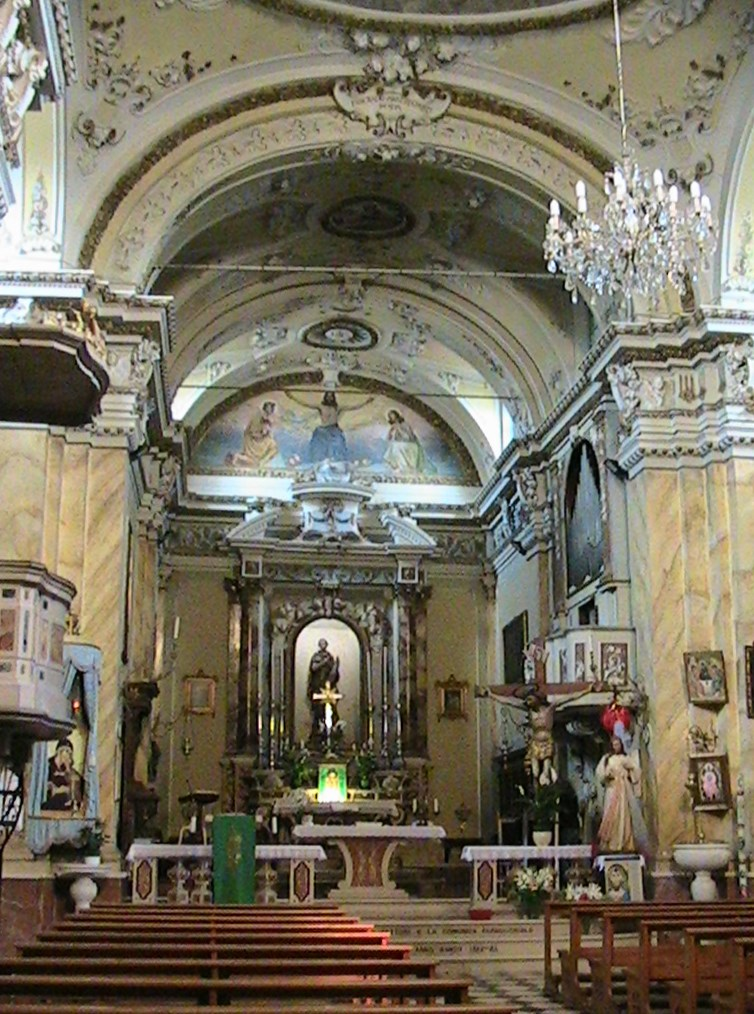
Interior of church

== History ==
In 1080, Annibale Giovanni, descendants of German barons in possession of the territory, built a chapel here dedicated to San Pancrazio. The church appears to have undergone major reconstruction and enlargement, in recent centuries, with interiors refurbished in 18th and 19th centuries.
