= Santi Martino e Nicola, Gabbioneta-Binanuova =

Church in Gabbioneta-Binanuova, Italy

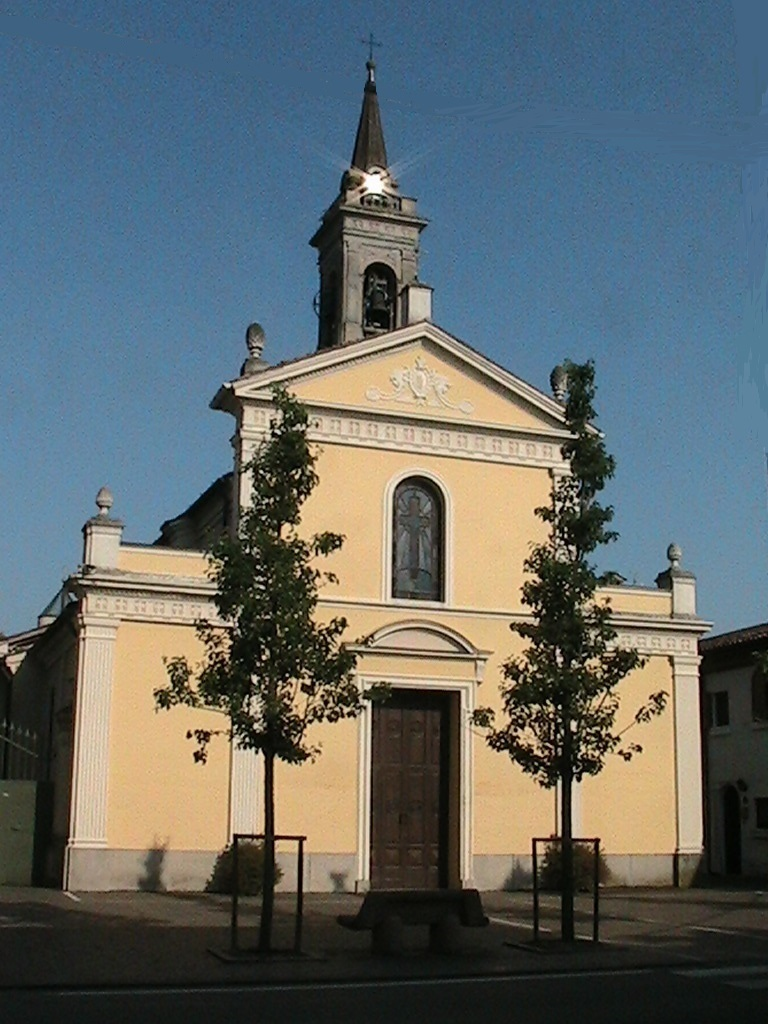
Binanuova (Gabbioneta-Binanuova) - Parish Church of Saints Martin and Nicholas.

Santi Martino e Nicola is a Roman Catholic parish church located on Via XX Settembre #32 in the town of Gabbioneta-Binanuova in the province of Cremona, region of Lombardy, Italy.

== History ==
By 1677, a church at the site had been refurbished and named a provost church. The facade faces east, as typical of early Christian churches. It was again expanded in the late 19th century. Initially dedicated only to San Nicola, it took on the title of San Martino with the destruction of a rural church and relocation of parish here. The interiors contain baroque altar dedicated to the Madonna of the Rosary. The church contains two canvases painted by the 16th-century painter Lorenzo De Becis, depicting St Sebastian and St Roch, derived from extant churches in the region. The church also has canvases depicting the Adoration of the Shepherds and the Apparation of the Virgin and Child to St Charles Borromeo with an eremitic Saint. The frescoes depicting the Charity of San Martino with San Nicola were painted in the 20th century by Giovanni Misani.
