= Pessina Cremonese =

- Comune
- Comune di Pessina Cremonese
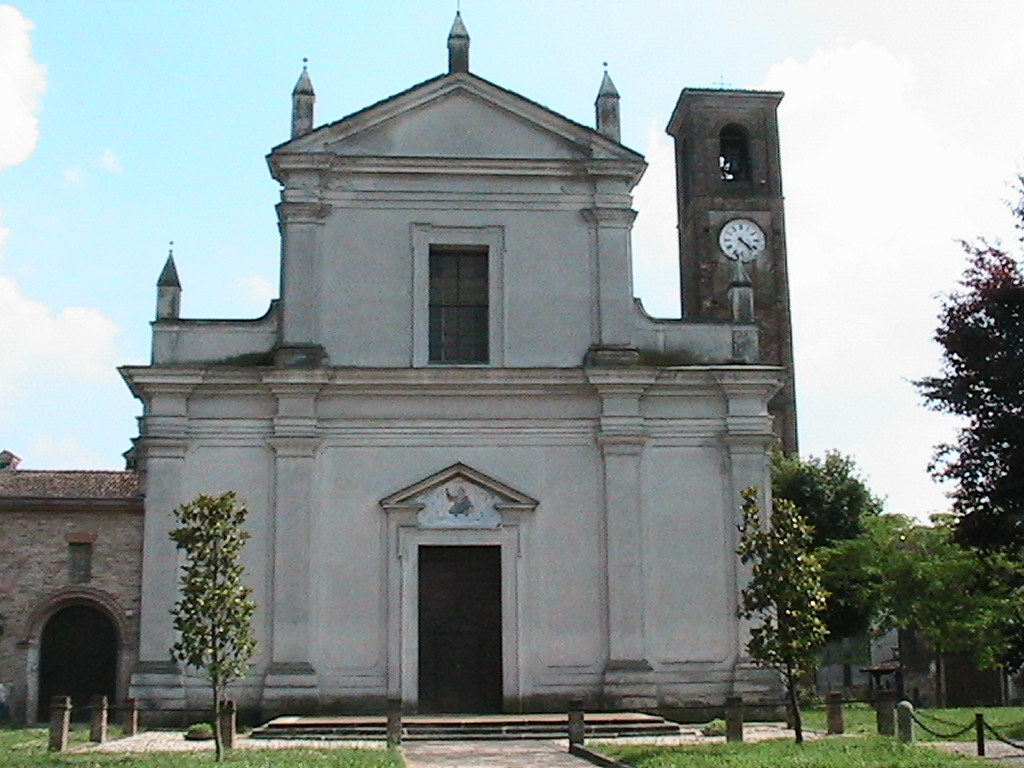
- Church of San Leonardo in Villarocca, Pessina Cremonese

- Location within Italy Location within Lombardy
- Coordinates: 45°11′N 10°15′E
- Country: Italy
- Region: Lombardy
- Province: Province of Cremona (CR)

Government
  - Mayor: Virginia Susta

Area
  - Total: 22.1 km^{2} (8.5 sq mi)
- Elevation: 42 m (138 ft)

Population (30 September 2016)
  - Total: 633
  - Density: 28.6/km^{2} (74.2/sq mi)
- Demonym: Pessinesi
- Time zone: UTC+1 (CET)
  - Summer (DST): UTC+2 (CEST)
- Postal code: 26030
- Dialing code: 0372

Pessina Cremonese (Cremunés: La Pesìna) is a comune (municipality) in the Province of Cremona in the Italian region Lombardy, located about 90 kilometres (56 mi) southeast of Milan and about 20 kilometres (12 mi) northeast of Cremona.

Pessina Cremonese borders the following municipalities: Cappella de' Picenardi, Gabbioneta-Binanuova, Isola Dovarese, Ostiano, Pescarolo ed Uniti, Torre de' Picenardi, Volongo.

== Sikh Temple ==
On 21 August 2011 a temple for the local Sikh community was inaugurated. The construction of the building with a space of 2352 square meters for 500 worshippers cost 1.3 million Euro. Further funds will be needed to erect the five golden cupolas of the temple. The Gurdwara follows Shri Guru Kalgidhar Singh Sabha. It is said to be the largest gurdwara in continental Europe (i.e. not including Britain, which has a large Sikh community).

== Notable people ==
- Rachele Fassera (born 1946), Roman Catholic religious sister and missionary
