= Madonna and Child (Jacopo Bellini) =

1450 painting by Jacopo Bellini

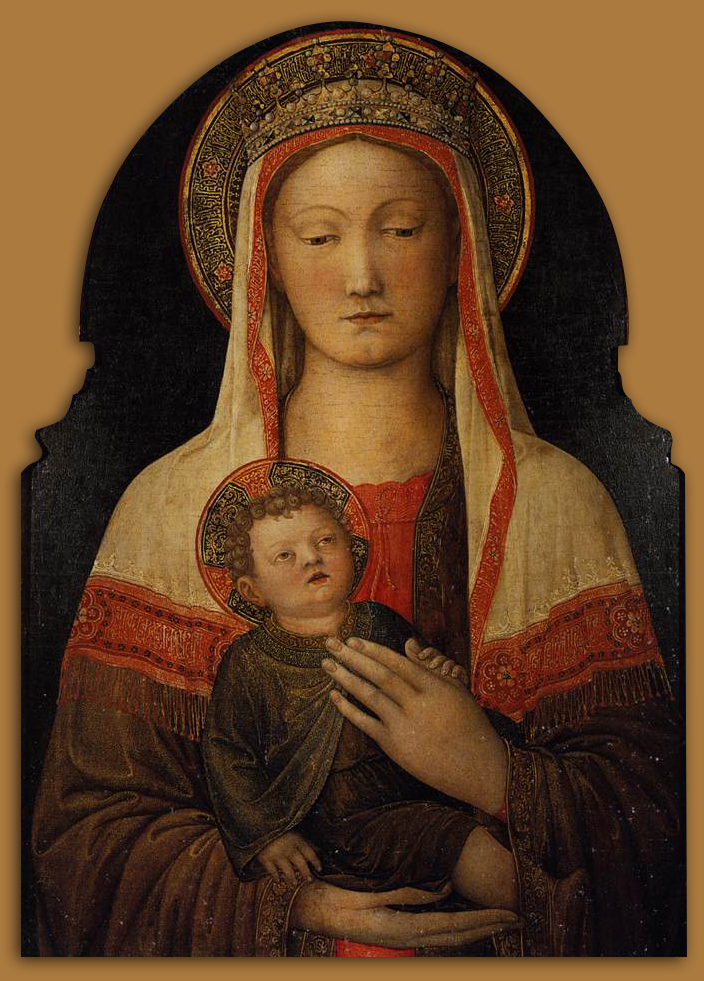

Madonna and Child is a 1450 tempera on panel painting by Jacopo Bellini, now in the Uffizi in Florence. It was bought for its present home by Corrado Ricci in 1906 from a monastery in Lucca in 1906, where it had been spotted by the antiquarian Costantini. Its sale had provoked several polemics in the newspapers.

The work belongs to the artist's Renaissance phase under the influence of Masolino da Panicale, who was in Lucca from 1435 to 1440, an influence Bellini assimilated via Antonio Vivarini. The shape of the work and its frame suggests a view through a window - which even includes a parapet in a similar work by the artist now in the Gallerie dell'Accademia, showing Flemish influence.
