= San Martino del Lago =

- Comune
- Comune di San Martino del Lago
- Coat of arms

- Location within Italy Location within Lombardy
- Coordinates: 45°4′N 10°19′E
- Country: Italy
- Region: Lombardy
- Province: Cremona (CR)
- Frazioni: Cà de' Soresini

Government
  - Mayor: Dino Maglia

Area
  - Total: 10.4 km^{2} (4.0 sq mi)

Population (2009)
  - Total: 501
  - Density: 48.2/km^{2} (125/sq mi)
- Time zone: UTC+1 (CET)
  - Summer (DST): UTC+2 (CEST)
- Postal code: 26040
- Dialing code: 0375

San Martino del Lago (Cremunés: San Martén) is a comune (municipality) in the Province of Cremona in the Italian region Lombardy, located about 100 kilometres (62 mi) southeast of Milan and about 25 kilometres (16 mi) southeast of Cremona.

San Martino del Lago borders the following municipalities: Ca' d'Andrea, Cingia de' Botti, Scandolara Ravara, Solarolo Rainerio, Voltido. The municipal seat is in the frazione of Cà de' Soresini.
