= Pieve San Giacomo =

Pieve San Giacomo Piéef San Giàcum (Lombard)
- Comune
- Comune di Pieve San Giacomo
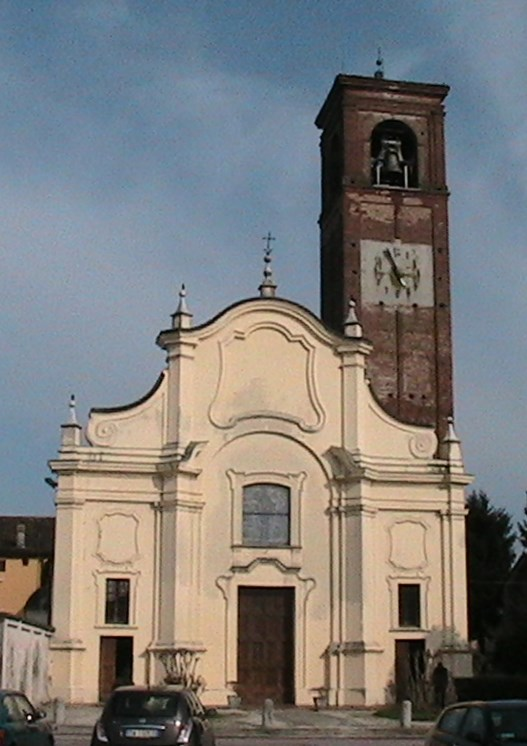

- Location within Italy Location within Lombardy
- Coordinates: 45°8′N 10°11′E
- Country: Italy
- Region: Lombardy
- Province: Cremona (CR)

Government
  - Mayor: Silvia Genzini

Area
  - Total: 14.9 km^{2} (5.8 sq mi)
- Elevation: 39 m (128 ft)

Population (30 September 2016)
  - Total: 1,585
  - Density: 106/km^{2} (276/sq mi)
- Demonym: Pievesi
- Time zone: UTC+1 (CET)
  - Summer (DST): UTC+2 (CEST)
- Postal code: 26035
- Dialing code: 0372

Pieve San Giacomo (Cremunés: Piéef San Giàcum) is a comune (municipality) in the Province of Cremona, Lombardy, Italy. It is located about 90 kilometres (56 mi) southeast of Milan and about 12 kilometres (7.5 mi) east of Cremona.

Pieve San Giacomo borders the following municipalities: Cappella de' Picenardi, Cella Dati, Cicognolo, Derovere, Sospiro, Vescovato.

== History ==
=== Origins ===
Pieve San Giacomo owes its origins to the important area where it was located, namely, very close to the city of Cremona and crossed by the Via Postumia. The territory where the town now stands was subject to the invasions of the Gauls, so only the continued presence of the community could serve as an effective active defence. Some accounts by historian Don Angelo Grandi confirm that Bishop Babila was beheaded right on the Via Postumia; he later became the patron saint of the village. However, the parish church was dedicated to St. James the Apostle in the 11th century by Countess Matilde de Canossa, as she was particularly devoted to the saint.

In the Po Valley, after the fall of the Western Roman Empire, the Franks settled. Centuries later, they erected a monastery sacred to St. Benedict; Benedictine monks remained in Pieve San Giacomo until the 1600s, such evidence being evidenced by the discovery of two tombs with the remains of two friars rediscovered in 1963.

=== 20th century ===
Young craftsman Giuseppe Borghisani obtained a diploma as a mechanical expert and began designing chandeliers in Pieve San Giacomo for Murano glassworks. His artistic talents led him to create works that can still be seen today in Monte Carlo, Paris, and London.

Of note was the Manfredi firm, founded by Amilcare Manfredi, who was eager to push industrial production. The firm processed more than 25 thousand square metres of wood annually and was a world leader in wood panelling. The company had to close its doors in 1994 due to a severe crisis that had led workers to occupy the municipal headquarters in Pieve San Giacomo the previous year.

After World War II, the Auricchio dairy was established in Gazzo. To this day, the dairy processes 2,000 quintals of milk daily, obtaining mainly the typical provolone cheese.

In 1954 the Unione sportiva Pievese (cycling) arose, which later became U.S. Decordi-Pievese, and under the able presidency of master Ivan Masseroni captured successes a little everywhere. In 1967, the blue-and-white club changed disciplines, switching to soccer, and in this area, too, it managed to reap laurels and acclaim. U.S. Pievese has the merit of having built, locally and at its total expense, the first sports facility: the "Amedeo Manfredi" field.

In 1974, as part of the oratory, a few boys chose a hitherto unknown sport: field hockey. In the span of a few years, this club, U.S. Pier Giorgio Frassati, reached the highest national heights (A/2).

== Anthropogenic geography ==
The municipal territory includes, in addition to the main town, the hamlets of Gazzo and Ognissanti, and the localities of Albere, Bredazze, Ca' de Varani, Canova, Canovetta, Casella, Castellazzo, Fornasotto, Gazzolo, Malpensata, Molino, Muradelle, Olzo, Riposo, Silvella, Silvelletta and Torre Berteri.

=== Gazzo ===
In the Mesolithic era, between the ninth and fifth millennia B.C., at the end of the laciations, the Po Valley appeared as a vast expanse of swamps and marshes, which gave shape to Lakes Gerundo, Delmona and various ponds, so much so that, in the early years of the Vulgar Era, a temple dedicated to Mephitis, goddess of the ponds, still existed in Cremona.

Popular imagination has it that there once lived in the waters of Lake Gerundo a dragon named Tarantasius, who, as he approached the shores, wreaked havoc on men and especially children and fouled the surrounding air with his asphyxiating breath. The exhalations, in fact, were due to the presence of methane and hydrogen sulfide in the subsoil, a mysterious phenomenon for the population, which therefore blamed unknown and fanciful beings.

The phantom monster, according to legend, was slain by an unknown hero who also drained the lake: none other than the progenitor of the Visconti Family of Milan who, after such a feat, adopted as his coat of arms the image of the bisque. Some popular sources attribute the draining and reclamation of the lake to Saint Christopher, who allegedly defeated the dragon, or to Frederick Barbarossa. The land reclamation was actually done by monks from nearby abbeys. It is commonly believed that in truth the waters disappeared as a result of progressive reclamation works that had been in progress for some time, particularly the strengthening of the Muzza Canal by the people of Lodi, as well as drainage factors and geological settlements, such as the levelling of moraine deposits near the Adda's entry into the Po.
