= Chiesa di Torricella, Ostiano =

Roman Catholic church in Lombardy, Italy

Coordinates: 45.2155°N 10.2781°E

The Chiesa di Torricella is a Romanesque-style, Roman Catholic oratory, or small church, located in a rural setting near the River Oglio, in the territory of Ostiano in the province of Cremona, region of Lombardy, Italy.

== History ==
This oratory was erected around the 12th or 13th century, at the site where one could ford or cross the Oglio river. In its facade, now almost faded, was an image of St Christopher, patron of the traveller. The interiors have some frescoes including an Adoration of the Magi (1539) by unknown Brescian painters.
