= Volongo =

Volongo Ulònch (Lombard)
- Comune
- Comune di Volongo
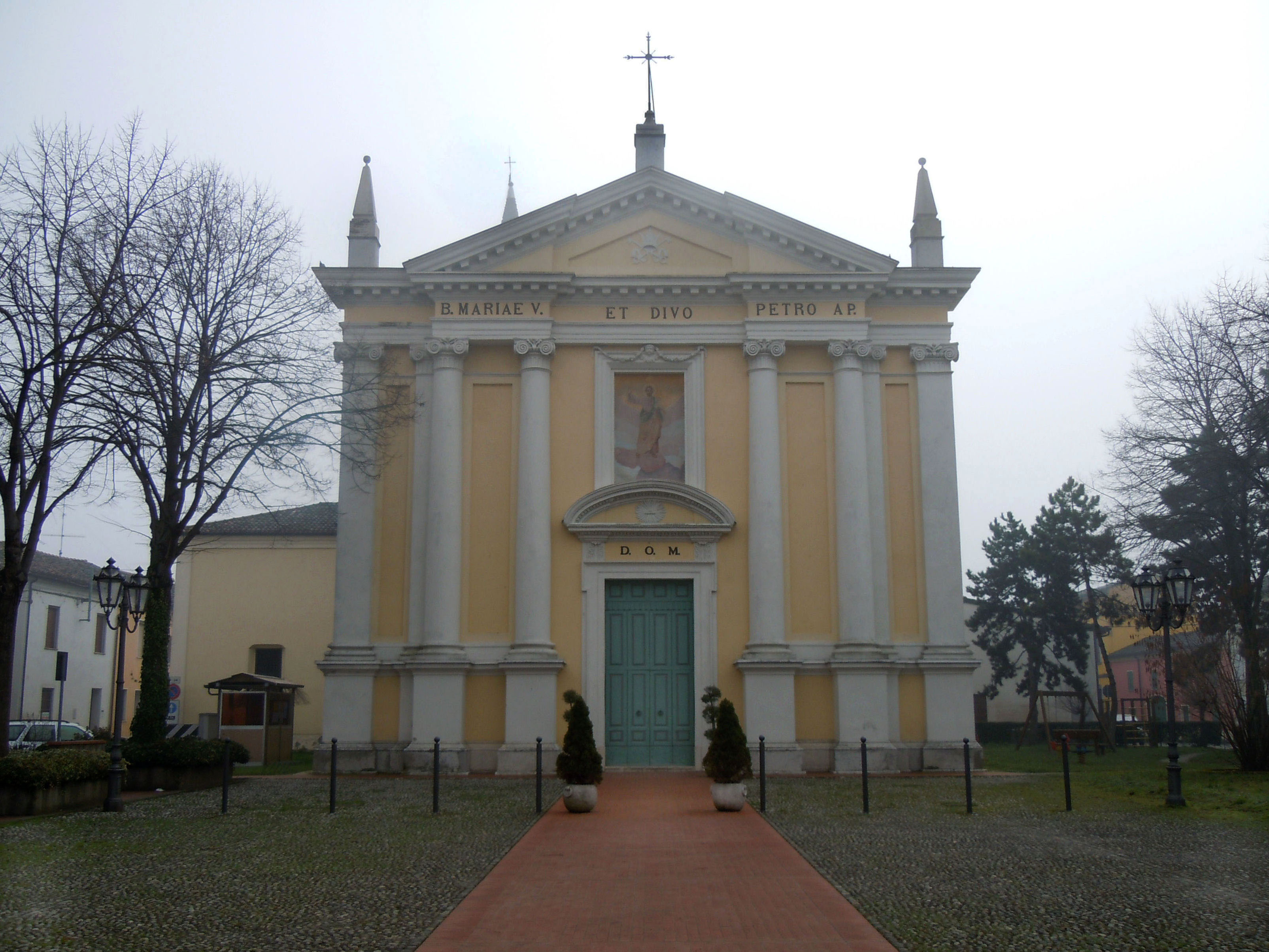

- Location within Italy Location within Lombardy
- Coordinates: 45°13′N 10°18′E
- Country: Italy
- Region: Lombardy
- Province: Cremona (CR)

Government
  - Mayor: Piera Lupi

Area
  - Total: 7.9 km^{2} (3.1 sq mi)
- Elevation: 43 m (141 ft)

Population (30 November 2017)
  - Total: 499
  - Density: 63/km^{2} (160/sq mi)
- Demonym: Volonghesi
- Time zone: UTC+1 (CET)
  - Summer (DST): UTC+2 (CEST)
- Postal code: 26030
- Dialing code: 0372
- Website: Official website

Volongo (locally Ulònch) is a comune (municipality) in the Province of Cremona in the Italian region Lombardy, located about 90 kilometres (56 mi) southeast of Milan and about 25 kilometres (16 mi) northeast of Cremona.

Volongo borders the following municipalities: Casalromano, Fiesse, Gambara, Isola Dovarese, Ostiano, Pessina Cremonese.
