= Fiesse =

Fiesse Fiès
- Comune
- Comune di Fiesse
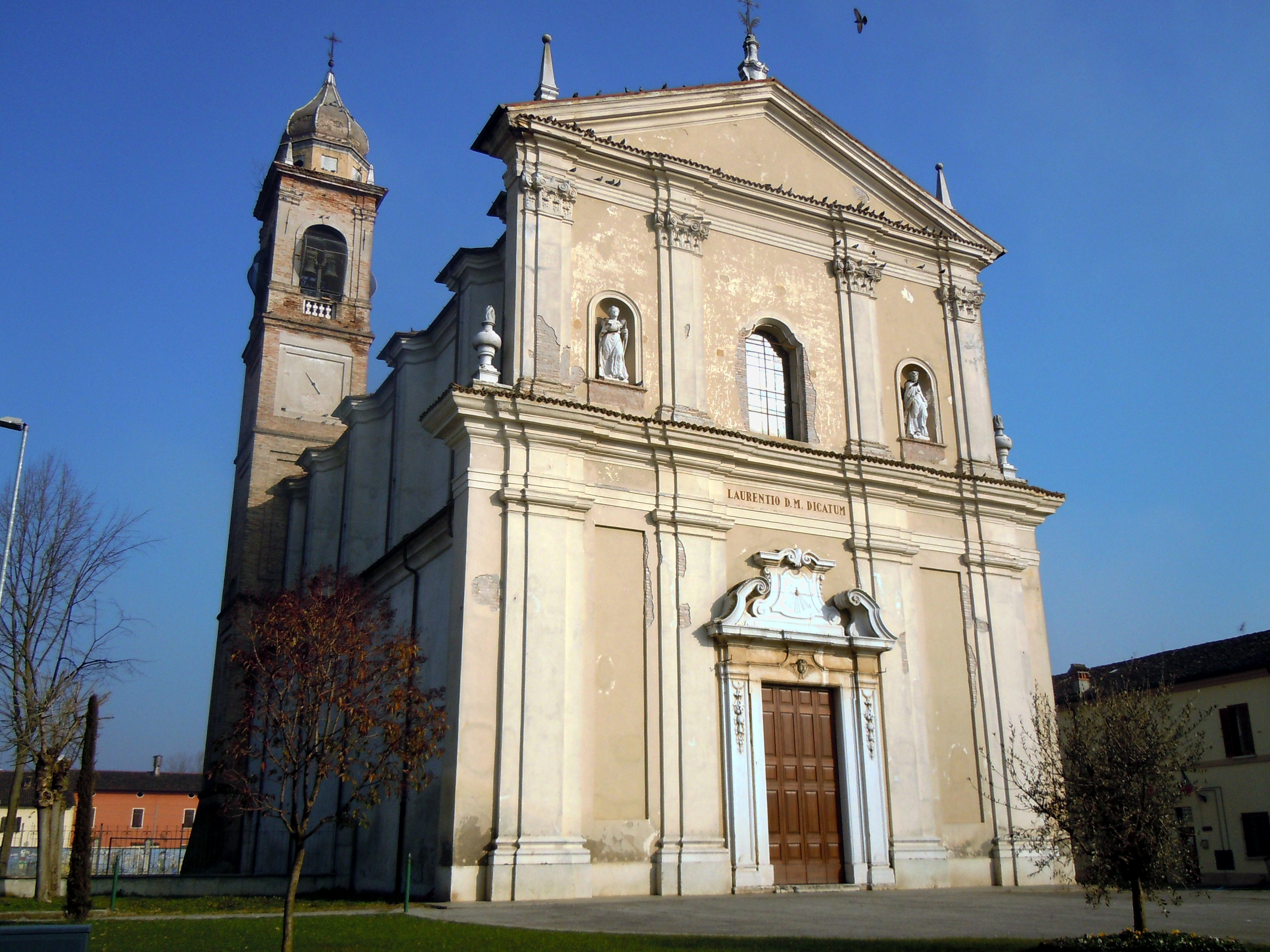

- Location within Italy Location within Lombardy
- Coordinates: 45°14′N 10°19′E
- Country: Italy
- Region: Lombardy
- Province: Province of Brescia (BS)
- Frazioni: Cadimarco

Government
  - Mayor: Sergio Cavallini

Area
  - Total: 16 km^{2} (6.2 sq mi)
- Elevation: 39 m (128 ft)

Population (30 November 2017)
  - Total: 2,041
  - Density: 130/km^{2} (330/sq mi)
- Demonym: Fiessesi
- Time zone: UTC+1 (CET)
  - Summer (DST): UTC+2 (CEST)
- Postal code: 25020
- Dialing code: 030
- Website: Official website

Fiesse (Brescian: Fiès) is a comune in the province of Brescia, Lombardy, northern Italy. It is bounded by other communes of Asola, Casalromano, Gambara, Remedello and Volongo.
