= Cingia de' Botti =

- Comune
- Comune di Cingia de' Botti
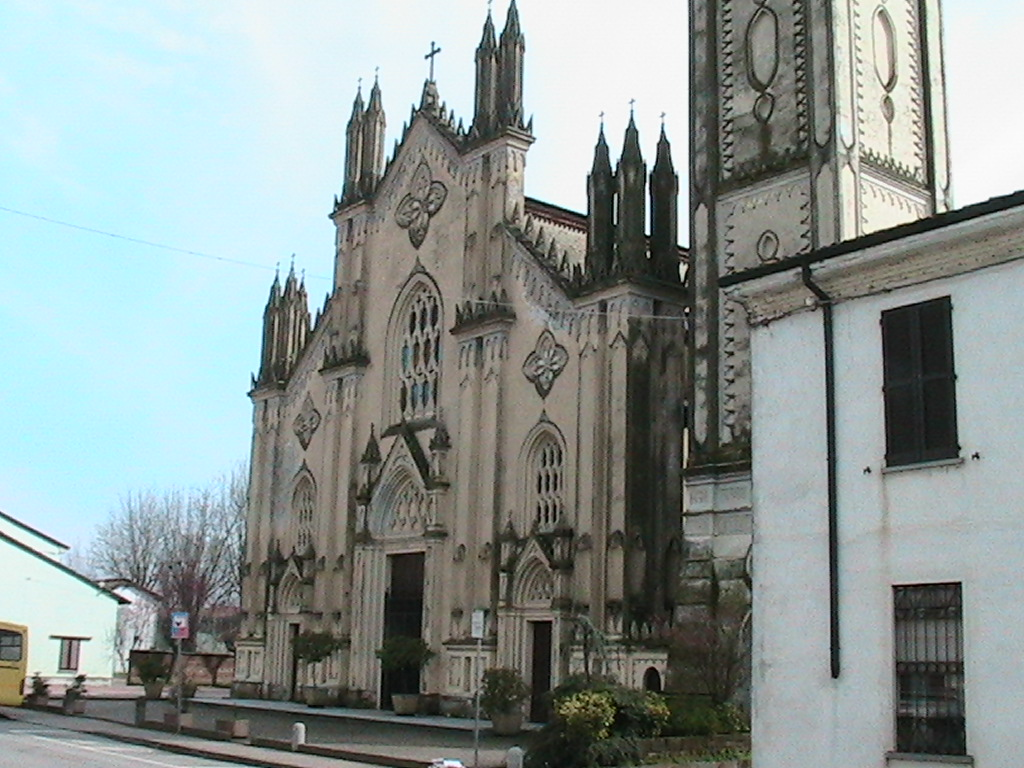
- Parish church of San Pietro.

- Coat of arms

- Location within Italy Location within Lombardy
- Coordinates: 45°5′N 10°17′E
- Country: Italy
- Region: Lombardy
- Province: Cremona (CR)

Government
  - Mayor: Pierpaolo Vigolini

Area
  - Total: 14.4 km^{2} (5.6 sq mi)
- Elevation: 31 m (102 ft)

Population (30 June 2017)
  - Total: 1,228
  - Density: 85.3/km^{2} (221/sq mi)
- Demonym: Cingesi
- Time zone: UTC+1 (CET)
  - Summer (DST): UTC+2 (CEST)
- Postal code: 26042
- Dialing code: 0375
- Website: Official website

Cingia de' Botti (Cremunés: Singia) is a comune (municipality) in the Province of Cremona in the Italian region Lombardy, located about 100 kilometres (62 mi) southeast of Milan and about 20 kilometres (12 mi) southeast of Cremona.

Cingia de' Botti borders the following municipalities: Ca' d'Andrea, Cella Dati, Derovere, Motta Baluffi, San Martino del Lago, Scandolara Ravara.

In a 2005 ruling of the European Court of Justice, the comune's award of a concession contract for public gas distribution services was criticised, as the contract had been awarded to a company called Padania without a competitive procurement process, contrary to EU regulations. Padania was a public-sector company owned by the Province of Cremona and most of the comunes within the province, including Cingia de’ Botti, but also open, at least to some degree, to private part-ownership.
