= Piadena Drizzona =

- Comune
- Comune di Piadena Drizzona
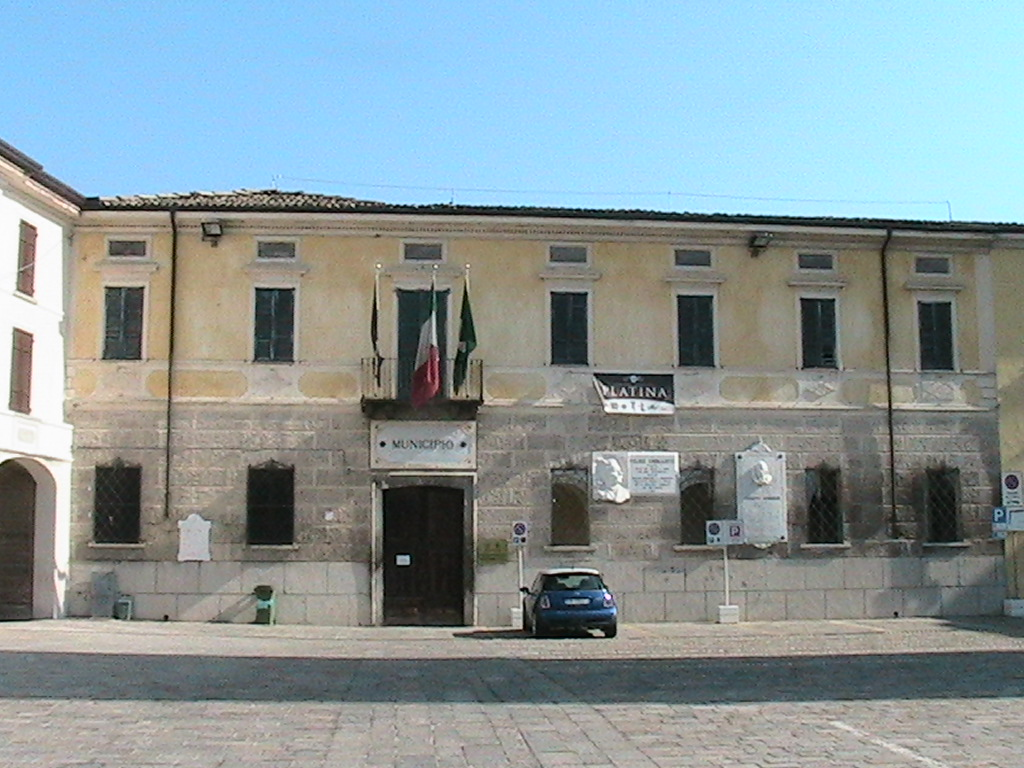
- Piadena Town Hall, former convent of Gerolimini

- Location within Italy Location within Lombardy
- Coordinates: 45°8′10″N 10°21′37″E
- Country: Italy
- Region: Lombardy
- Province: Cremona (CR)

Government
  - Mayor: Alfonso Sadutto

Area
  - Total: 31.69 km^{2} (12.24 sq mi)

Population (31 December 2018)
  - Total: 4,017
  - Density: 126.8/km^{2} (328.3/sq mi)
- Time zone: UTC+1 (CET)
  - Summer (DST): UTC+2 (CEST)
- Postal code: 26038
- Dialing code: 0375

Piadena Drizzona is a comune (municipality) in the Province of Cremona in the Italian region Lombardy.

It was established on 1 January 2019 by the merger of the municipalities of Piadena and Drizzona.
