= Gabbioneta-Binanuova =

Gabbioneta-Binanuova Gabiunéeda-Binanóva (Lombard)
- Comune
- Comune di Gabbioneta-Binanuova
- Location within Italy Location within Lombardy
- Coordinates: 45°13′N 10°13′E
- Country: Italy
- Region: Lombardy
- Province: Cremona (CR)

Government
  - Mayor: Karin Spinelli

Area
  - Total: 15.71 km^{2} (6.07 sq mi)
- Elevation: 38 m (125 ft)

Population (31 August 2017)
  - Total: 846
  - Density: 53.9/km^{2} (139/sq mi)
- Time zone: UTC+1 (CET)
  - Summer (DST): UTC+2 (CEST)
- Postal code: 26030
- Dialing code: 0372

Gabbioneta-Binanuova (Cremunés: Gabiunéeda-Binanóva) is a comune (municipality) in the Province of Cremona in the Italian region Lombardy, about 90 kilometres (56 mi) southeast of Milan and about 15 kilometres (9 mi) northeast of Cremona.

Gabbioneta-Binanuova borders the following municipalities: Grontardo, Ostiano, Pescarolo ed Uniti, Pessina Cremonese, Scandolara Ripa d'Oglio, Seniga.

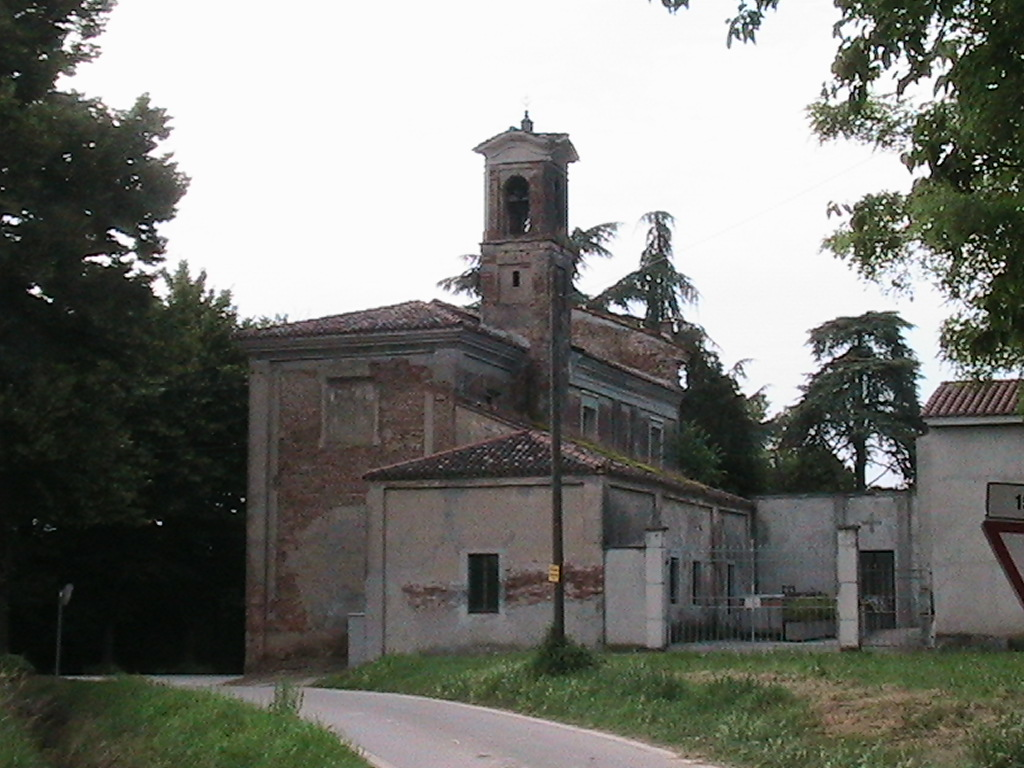
Oratory of the Blessed Virgin of Caravaggio, Gabbioneta-Binanuova.

The parish church, Santi Martino e Nicola is dedicated to the two saints. The church of Sant'Ambrogio was patronized by the Pallavicini family.

== Demographic evolution ==
Historical population

Year	Pop.	±%
1861	1,835	—
1871	2,032	+10.7%
1881	1,844	−9.3%
1901	1,769	−4.1%
1911	1,950	+10.2%

Year	Pop.	±%
1921	1,910	−2.1%
1931	1,978	+3.6%
1936	2,019	+2.1%
1951	1,893	−6.2%
1961	1,589	−16.1%

Year	Pop.	±%
1971	1,207	−24.0%
1981	1,081	−10.4%
1991	971	−10.2%
2001	968	−0.3%

Source: Data from ISTAT
