= Oratory of the Disciplini, Ostiano =

Church in Ostiano, Italy

Coordinates: 45.2210°N 10.2495°E

The Oratorio dei Disciplini is a Roman Catholic oratory, or small church, located in Ostiano in the province of Cremona, region of Lombardy, Italy.

== History ==
This oratory was erected in 1606 by a flagellant confraternity, and dedicated to the Virgin of the Assumption. The interior is notable for life-size canvas depictions of eight saints, painted by Giuseppe Tortelli.
