= Isola Dovarese =

- Comune
- Comune di Isola Dovarese
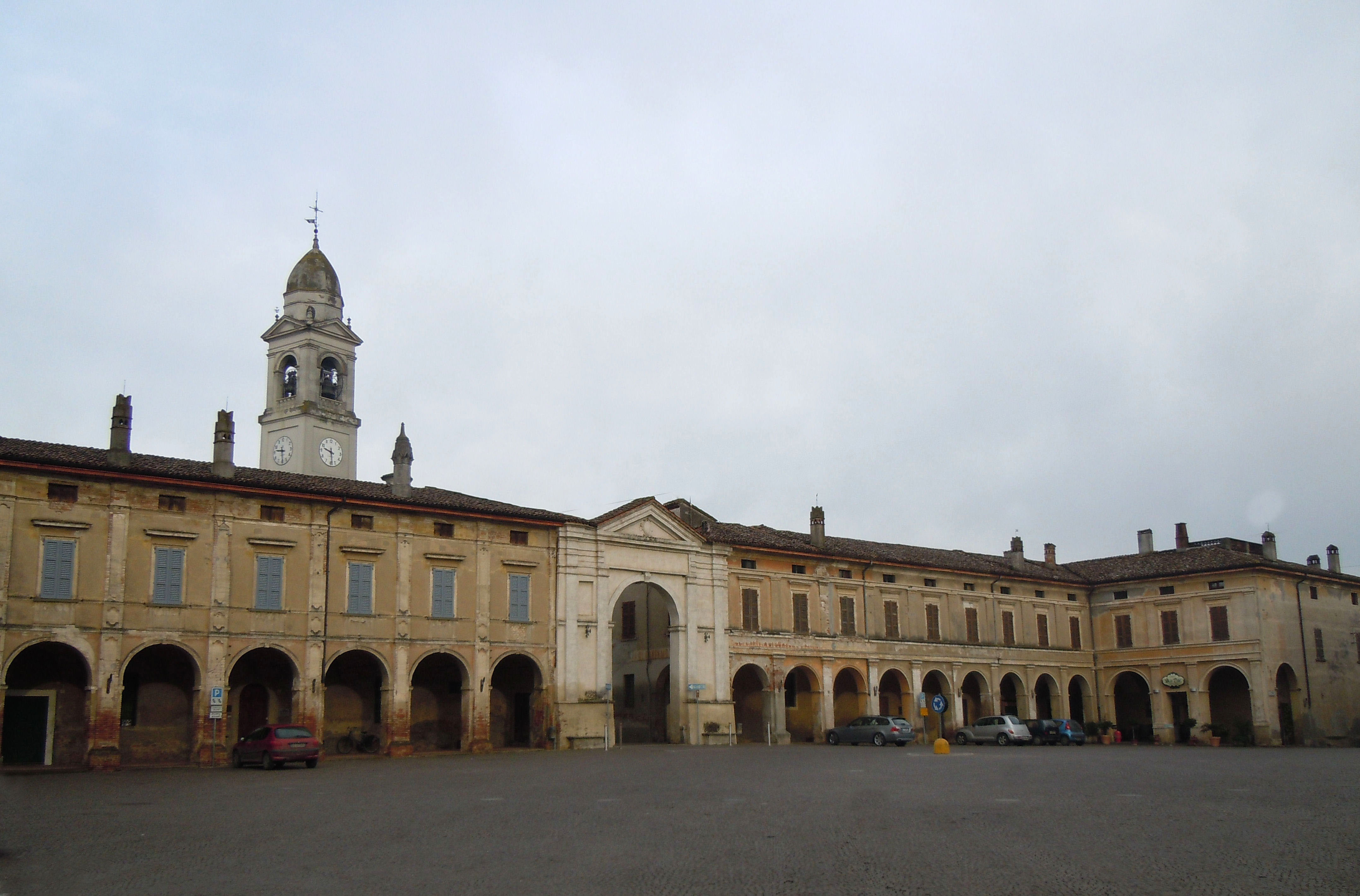
- Piazza Matteotti.

- Coat of arms

- Location within Italy Location within Lombardy
- Coordinates: 45°10′N 10°18′E
- Country: Italy
- Region: Lombardy
- Province: Cremona (CR)

Government
  - Mayor: Gianpaolo Gansi

Area
  - Total: 9.4 km^{2} (3.6 sq mi)
- Elevation: 35 m (115 ft)

Population (31 August 2017)
  - Total: 1,158
  - Density: 120/km^{2} (320/sq mi)
- Demonym: Isolani
- Time zone: UTC+1 (CET)
  - Summer (DST): UTC+2 (CEST)
- Postal code: 26031
- Dialing code: 0375
- Website: Official website

Isola Dovarese (Cremunés: Ìzula) is a comune (municipality) in the Province of Cremona in the Italian region Lombardy, located about 90 kilometres (56 mi) southeast of Milan and about 20 kilometres (12 mi) east of Cremona.

Isola Dovarese borders the following municipalities: Canneto sull'Oglio, Casalromano, Drizzona, Pessina Cremonese, Torre de' Picenardi, Volongo.

== Twin towns ==
Isola Dovarese is twinned with:

- Velaux, France
