= Drizzona =

Drizzona La Drisùna (Lombard)
- Comune
- Comune di Drizzona
- Coat of arms

- Location within Italy Location within Lombardy
- Coordinates: 45°9′N 10°21′E
- Country: Italy
- Region: Lombardy
- Province: Cremona (CR)
- Frazioni: Castelfranco d'Oglio, Pontirolo

Government
  - Mayor: Ivana Cavazzini

Area
  - Total: 11.7 km^{2} (4.5 sq mi)

Population (Dec. 2004)
  - Total: 532
  - Density: 45.5/km^{2} (118/sq mi)
- Demonym: Drizzonesi
- Time zone: UTC+1 (CET)
  - Summer (DST): UTC+2 (CEST)
- Postal code: 26034
- Dialing code: 0375
- Website: Official website

Drizzona (Cremunés: La Drisùna) is a former comune (municipality) in the Province of Cremona in the Italian region Lombardy, located about 100 kilometres (62 mi) southeast of Milan and about 25 kilometres (16 mi) east of Cremona. On 1 January 2019 it merged with Piadena to form Piadena Drizzona.

Drizzona bordered the following municipalities: Canneto sull'Oglio, Isola Dovarese, Piadena, Torre de' Picenardi, Voltido.
