= Ostiano =

Ostiano Üstià (Lombard)
- Comune
- Comune di Ostiano
- Location within Italy Location within Lombardy
- Coordinates: 45°13′N 10°15′E
- Country: Italy
- Region: Lombardy
- Province: Province of Cremona (CR)

Area
  - Total: 19.4 km^{2} (7.5 sq mi)

Population (Dec. 2004)
  - Total: 3,054
  - Density: 157/km^{2} (408/sq mi)
- Time zone: UTC+1 (CET)
  - Summer (DST): UTC+2 (CEST)
- Postal code: 26032
- Dialing code: 0372
- Website: Official website

Ostiano (Brescian: Üstià) is a comune (municipality) in the Province of Cremona in the Italian region Lombardy, located about 90 kilometres (56 mi) southeast of Milan and about 20 kilometres (12 mi) northeast of Cremona. As of 31 December 2004, it had a population of 3,054 and an area of 19.4 square kilometres (7.5 mi^{2}).

Ostiano borders the following municipalities: Gabbioneta-Binanuova, Gambara, Pessina Cremonese, Pralboino, Seniga, Volongo.

Among the churches in the territory are:

- Oratory of the Disciplini
- Pieve di San Gaudenzio former abbey church
- San Michele Arcangelo parish church
- Chiesa di Torricella Romanesque oratory

== Demographic evolution ==
Historical population

Year	Pop.	±%
1861	3,251	—
1871	3,402	+4.6%
1881	3,445	+1.3%
1901	3,828	+11.1%
1911	3,963	+3.5%

Year	Pop.	±%
1921	3,891	−1.8%
1931	3,925	+0.9%
1936	3,892	−0.8%
1951	3,778	−2.9%
1961	3,355	−11.2%

Year	Pop.	±%
1971	3,153	−6.0%
1981	3,137	−0.5%
1991	3,063	−2.4%
2001	3,018	−1.5%

Source: Data from ISTAT
