= Sant'Alessandro, Brescia =

Church in Brescia, Italy

Coordinates: 45.5353°N 10.2233°E

Sant'Alessandro is a Baroque style, Roman Catholic parish church located on Via Moretto, 73/A in Brescia, region of Lombardy, Italy.

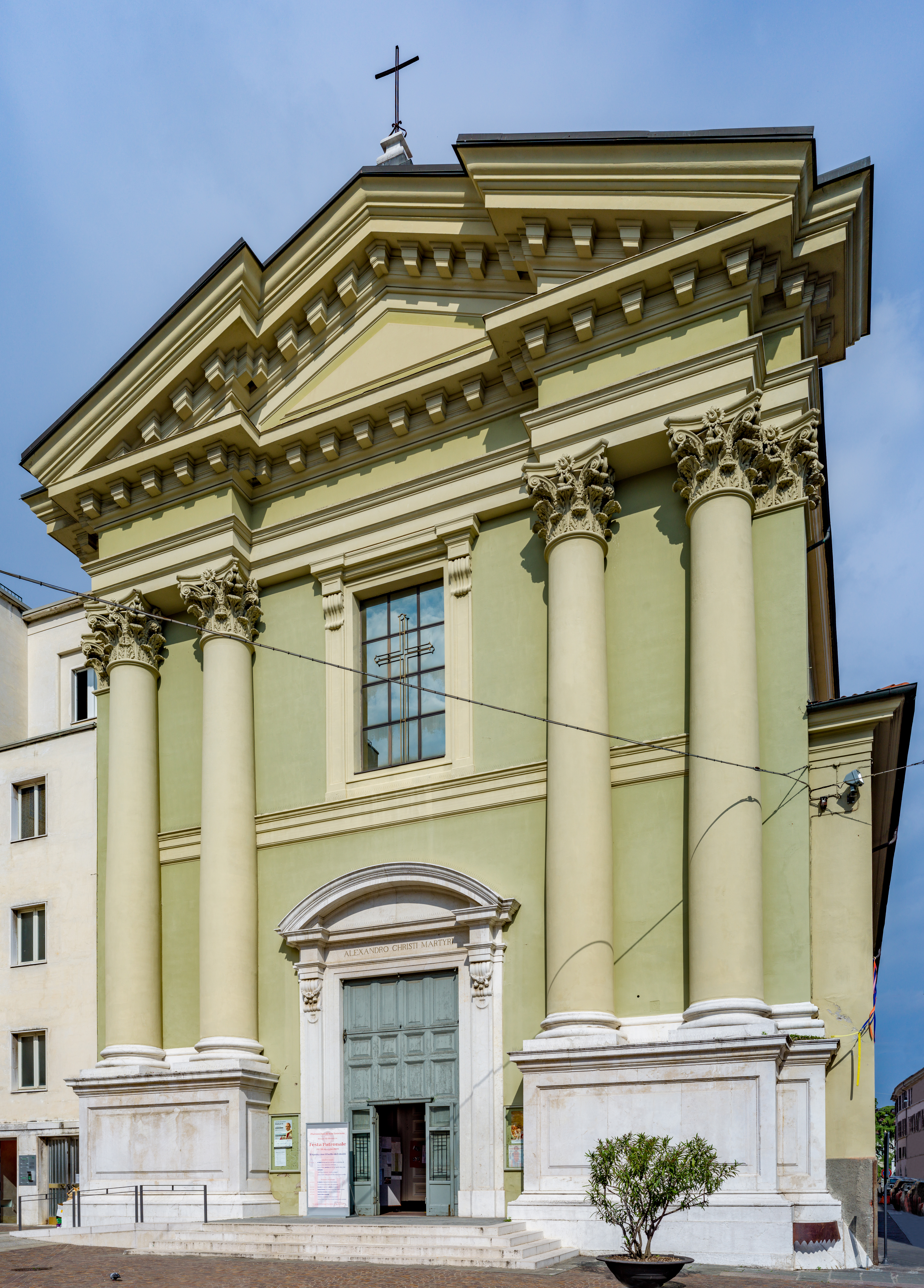
The Sant'Alessandro facade

== History ==
The first church at the site was founded in 1153, adjacent to a hospital, by the 15th century it had been granted to the Servite nuns. The church was consecrated in 1466, then rebuilt in Baroque style in 1784, but the facade was only completed by 1891. A fountain is present in the square in front.

Among the interior altarpiece paintings are:

- Annunciation, 1st altar, by Jacopo Bellini
- Pieta (1504), 2nd altar, Vincenzo Civerchio
- Painting (1943) by Angelo Righetti, replaces the ancient Icon of Mary, 3rd altar by Gregoretti
- Ecce Homo, 4th altar, fresco by Lattanzio Gambara
- Martyrdom of St Alexander, main altarpiece, Pietro Moro, replaced the masterpiece polyptych of Girolamo Romanino, now in the National Gallery in London.
- St Phillip Benizzi, 7th altar, by Grazio Cossali
- Saints Roch, Lodovico, and Sebastian, 9th altar, Sebastiano Arragonese

Over the entrance doorway are paintings of the Lives of Saints Alexander and Filippo Benizzi by Girolamo Rossi.
