= Giovanni Molin =

Italian Roman Catholic cardinal

- Cardinal-Priest of San Sisto
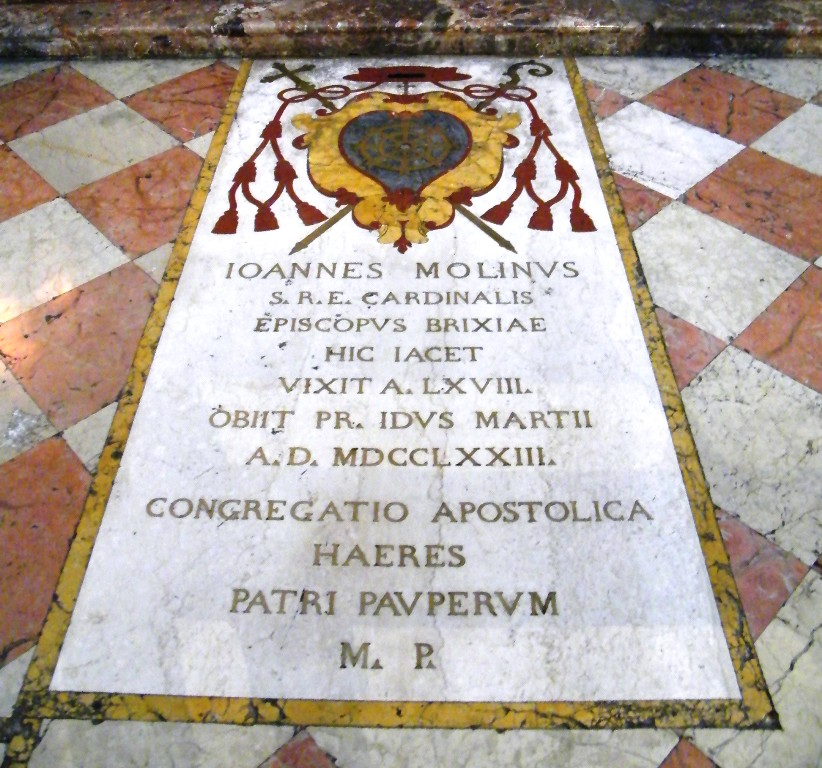
- Tombstone in Duomo Nuovo, Brescia
- Church: Catholic Church
- See: San Sisto
- In office: 26 June 1769 – 4 March 1773
- Predecessor: Giuseppe Agostino Orsi
- Successor: Juan Tomás de Boxadors
- Other post: Bishop of Brescia (1755-1773)

Orders
- Ordination: 22 May 1728
- Consecration: 1 April 1755 by Cardinal Marquis of Almenara

Personal details
- Born: 25 April 1705 Venice, Republic of Venice
- Died: 14 March 1773 (aged 67)

Giovanni Molin (25 April 1705 – 14 March 1773) was an Italian Roman Catholic cardinal.

Giovanni was born in Venice to a patrician family. He studied both civil and canon law at the University of Padua, and in 1728, he became a Franciscan priest.

In 1755, he was appointed as bishop of Brescia, where he became a patron of the Biblioteca Queriniana. On 23 November 1761, he was elevated to Cardinal by pope Clement XIII. This placed him in conflict with the Venetian senate who had imposed some controls over monastic orders. These controls were in conflict with contents in the latest papal bull of In Coena Domini. In 1769, Molin was able to move to Rome. He became titular priest for the church of San Sisto in 1769. He is buried in the Cathedral of Brescia.
