= Dal Pescatore =

Restaurant in Mantua province, Italy

Coordinates: 45°10′15.2″N 10°21′26.3″E

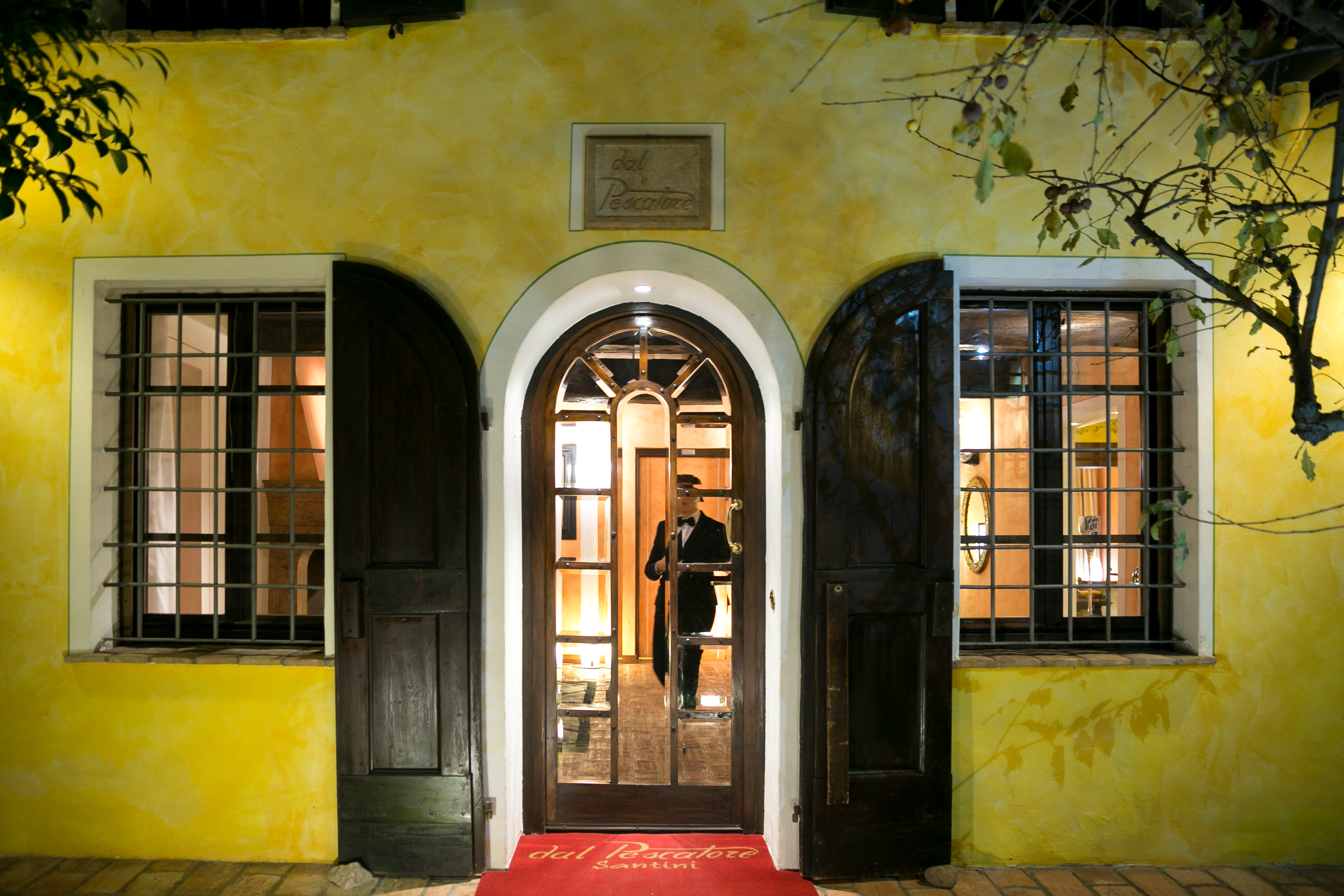
- Image of Dal Pescatore restaurant
- Interactive map of Dal Pescatore

Restaurant information
- Established: 1925
- Owner: Santini family
- Chef: Giovanni Santini; Bruna Santini
- Rating: Michelin Guide
- Location: Canneto sull'Oglio, Lombardy, Italy
- Website: www.dalpescatore.com

Dal Pescatore is a restaurant in Canneto sull'Oglio, Italy, south of the city of Mantua. The chefs are Giovanni Santini, and Alberto Santini.

The restaurant was voted 48th best in the world in the Restaurant Top Fifty of 2009. It also has held three Michelin stars since 1996, a record in Italy and the first won by an Italian woman.

The restaurant is notable for its tortelli stuffed with pumpkin, amaretto, Parmesan cheese, and mostarda.

== See also ==
- List of Michelin 3-star restaurants
- List of Michelin-starred restaurants in Italy
