= Giuseppe Zola =

Italian painter

Giuseppe Zola (5 March 1672 – 27 March 1743) was an Italian painter of the Baroque period, mainly active in Ferrara.

He mainly painted landscapes with small figures. Born in Brescia, where he studied with Giuseppe Tortelli. His sister was also a painter.

Other sources indicate his style was developed working under Giulio Giacinto Avellino, a painter from Messina active in Ferrara. Two of his works are displayed in the Pinacoteca of Cassa di Risparmio di Ferrara.
