= Piadena =

- Comune
- Comune di Piadena
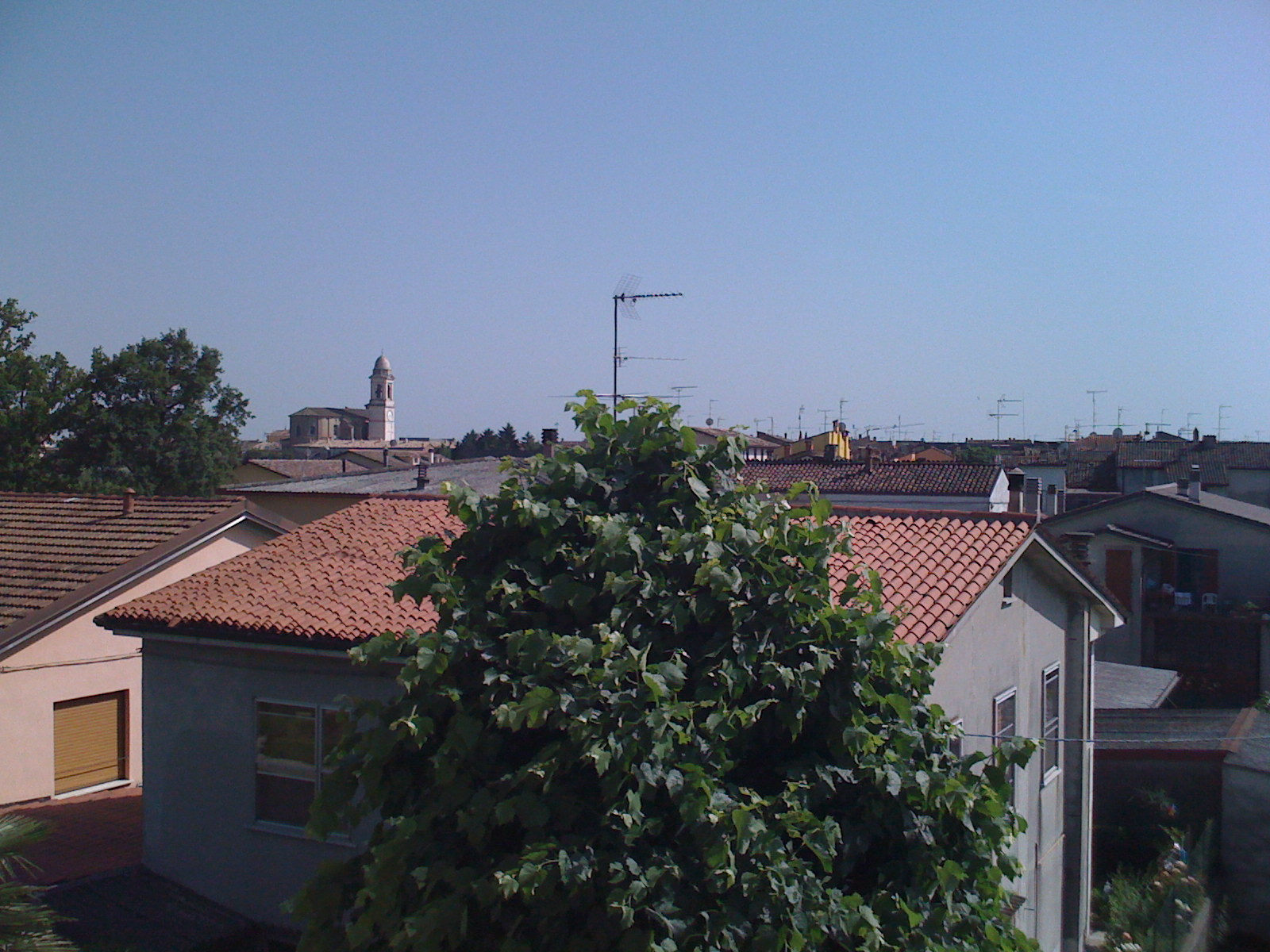

- Coat of arms

- Location within Italy Location within Lombardy
- Coordinates: 45°8′N 10°22′E
- Country: Italy
- Region: Lombardy
- Province: Cremona (CR)
- Frazioni: Vho, S.Lorenzo Guazzone, S.Paolo Ripa Oglio

Government
  - Mayor: Bruno Tosatto

Area
  - Total: 19 km^{2} (7.3 sq mi)
- Elevation: 34 m (112 ft)

Population (30 November 2008)
  - Total: 3,601
  - Density: 190/km^{2} (490/sq mi)
- Demonym: Piadenesi
- Time zone: UTC+1 (CET)
  - Summer (DST): UTC+2 (CEST)
- Postal code: 26034
- Dialing code: 0375
- Patron saint: St. Pammachius
- Saint day: 30 August
- Website: Official website

Piadena (Italian: [ˈpjaːdena], Eastern Lombard: [ˈpjadenɔ]) is a former comune (municipality) in the Province of Cremona, Lombardy, Italy. On January 1, 2019 it merged with Drizzona to form Piadena Drizzona.

It is approximately 30 kilometers east of Cremona; in addition to Cremona, Piadena is nearly equidistant from Parma (about 40 kilometers), Brescia (about 50 kilometers), and Mantua (about 35 kilometers), and this geographic position has made the town an important center of reference for the small towns in its surroundings. The territory is located on the right bank of the Oglio River in the plain north of Casalmaggiore.

Piadena is also a major railway junction. Its station is located at the crossroads of the railroads Brescia-Parma and Cremona-Mantua. State Road 10 Padana Inferiore runs through the town from west to east, and State Road 343 Asolana runs from north to south. The local economy is primarily dependent on agriculture, with minor industry, food, and metallurgy also present.

== History ==
Piadena was inhabited as early as prehistoric times, as proven by archaeological finds in the area. In the Neolithic, primitive peoples lived in huts located on high ground and in lake settlements in the Bronze Age. The etymology of Piadena is unknown: one relatively old version attributes the name to the exarch of Ravenna, Giovanni Platina, who erected the castrum Platinae here in 686. Other historians believe that the center was founded by an Etruscan settlement.

The locality is mentioned in a 990 deed by which the Cremonese bishop donated the castle to the Monastery of San Lorenzo in Cremona. In 1019, it was ceded by the Marquis of Tuscany, Boniface of Canossa, to the bishops of Cremona.

It was torched in 1306 by the Guelphs of Brescia and Mantua after being troubled for two centuries (13th and 14th century) by conflicts between Guelphs and Ghibellines. After being occupied by the Gonzagas, it was passed to the Visconti in 1348, who improved its defenses and erected watchtowers (the "torrazze di Salvaterra"), which can still be seen on the local coat of arms. It was seized by the Venetians in the 15th century but quickly recovered by the Duchy of Milan. The Sforza family bequeathed it to the Sanseverino family in 1494.

It was a fief of several families, including the Oscasali of Cremona and the Araldi. In the 17th century, Piadena was sacked during the war that pitted the Count of Modena against the Spanish. During the 18th and 19th centuries, Piadena shared the fate of the rest of the Lombard territory, from the first Habsburg rule, to the advent of Napoleon, and the establishment of the Lombard-Venetian Kingdom. Significant was the contribution made by the people of Piadena to the revolutionary uprisings of the Risorgimento.

Notable historic buildings are the former 17th-century Gerolimini convent, home of the town hall, and the 18th-century Magio Trecchi villa, where a nursing home for the elderly is in operation.

In the town hall, which occupies the former Gerolimini convent, there is an archaeological museum displaying numerous prehistoric, Celtic and Roman artifacts.

As of January 1, 2019, it merged with the municipality of Drizzona to form the new municipality of Piadena Drizzona.

=== Symbols ===
By Presidential Decree of June 26, 2008, Piadena received its coat of arms and flag.

"Coat of arms in silver, to the two covered towers, gules, bricked and windowed in black, united by the bridge in gules, bricked in black, with convex scaffolding, founded on the plain in azure, floating in silver, these towers accompanied at the point of honor by the waving bison in pole, azure, crowned in the ancient style in gold, engulfing the putto of flesh, hairy in black, with arms outstretched. Under the shield, on a bifid, fluttering list of silver, the motto, in capital letters of black, PROSPERA ET PROBATA PLATINA. Outward ornaments from common."

The municipal coat of arms is composed of some significant emblems of local history. The two masonry towers joined by a bridge over the river allude either to the features of the tower named Salvaterra, which was to be located on the Delmona Canal on the road to San Giovanni in Croce, or they allude to the two distinct defensive towers in the area, namely the Salvaterra Tower and the tower that was to stand near the Oglio River. Above the wall structure appears the unique Visconti coat of arms of a snake swallowing a man, a symbol of the victorious war exploits of the noble Visconti family. Under the coat of arms appears the name of the municipality in the ancient form of "Platina."

The gonfalone was a white drape with an azure border.

== World Heritage Site ==
It is home to one or more prehistoric pile-dwelling (or stilt house) settlements that are part of the Prehistoric Pile dwellings around the Alps UNESCO World Heritage Site.

== Culture ==
=== Events ===
- Fiera settembrina
- Festa del Platina

=== Museums ===
Civico Museo Platina

== Sports ==
Piadena has a great sports tradition. The football club is G.S. Danilo Martelli Piadena, which plays in the 2nd category championship; basketball is represented by G.S. Corona Platina, which plays in the B series. There is also a women's volleyball team, Volley Piadena A.S.D.
