= Rivarolo =

Rivarolo may refer to the following places in Italy:

- Rivarolo Canavese, comune in the province of Turin
- Rivarolo del Re ed Uniti, comune in the province of Cremona
- Rivarolo Mantovano, comune in the province of Mantua
- Rivarolo or Rivarolo Ligure, an autonomous commune until 1926, now a quarter of Genoa
