= Gallerani =

Gallerani is a surname. Notable people with the surname include:

- Andrea Gallerani (died 1251), Italian Roman Catholic soldier
- Cecilia Gallerani (1473–1536), Italian artist's model
- Simona Gallerani (born 1977), Italian cosmologist

== See also ==
- Galleani, surname
- Municipal Theater Cecilia Gallerani, Italian theatre
- Palazzo Venturi Gallerani, an 18th-century palace
