= Bernardo Bellincioni =

Italian poet

Bernardo Bellincioni (1452–1492) was an Italian poet, who began his career in the court of Lorenzo the Magnificent in Florence. In 1483 he was at the Gonzaga court and in 1485 he moved to Milan, where he was the court poet of Ludovico Sforza, the patron of Leonardo da Vinci. He wrote eulogistic sonnets addressed to his patrons and engaged in the usual literary squabbles with other poets, some in the burlesque manner established by Domenico Burchiello, that are a characteristic of the Italian Renaissance.

Bellincioni's occasional verse provided the literary clues to elaborate allegorical masques and state entries that were highlights of Early Modern court life. On the occasion of the marriage of the heir of Milan Gian Galeazzo Sforza to his cousin Isabella of Aragon, daughter of the King of Naples, Apollo presented the poems that had accompanied the tableaux in a little book (libretto) of fine calligraphy to the nineteen-year-old Isabella.

He composed an effusive ode to Cecilia Gallerani, the Lady with an Ermine in her portrait by Leonardo, "the envy of Nature", which has permitted the identification of the sitter: "She seems to listen and not talk."
