= La Belle Ferronnière =

Painting by Leonardo da Vinci

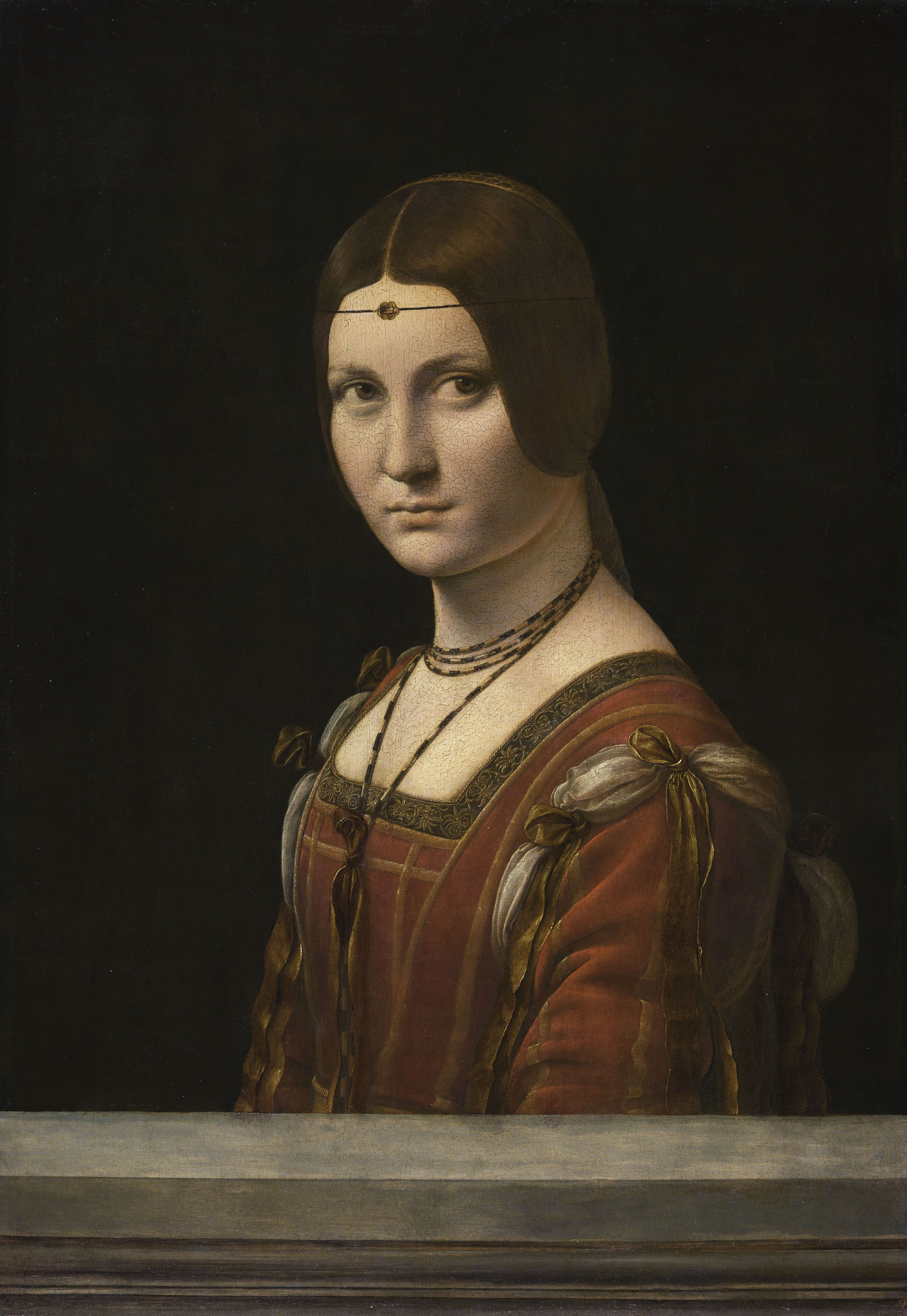
- Artist: Leonardo da Vinci or his Milanese circle
- Year: 1490–1496
- Medium: Oil on wood
- Dimensions: 62 cm × 44 cm (24 in × 17 in)
- Location: Louvre, Paris
- Website: louvre.fr/...cl010062372

La Belle Ferronnière (French pronunciation: [la bɛl fɛʁɔnjɛʁ]) is a portrait painting of a lady, by Leonardo da Vinci, in the Louvre. It is also known as Portrait of an Unknown Woman. The painting's title, applied as early as the seventeenth century, identifying the sitter as the wife or daughter of an ironmonger (a ferronnier), was said to be discreetly alluding to a reputed mistress of Francis I of France, married to a certain Le Ferron. Later she was tentatively identified as Lucretia Crivelli, a married lady-in-waiting to Duchess Beatrice of Milan, who became another of the Duke's mistresses.

Leonardo's Lady with an Ermine has also been known by this name. This was once believed to be a portrait of Cecilia Gallerani, one of the mistresses of Ludovico Sforza, Duke of Milan. The narrative and the title were applied to Lady with an Ermine when it was in Princess Izabela Czartoryska's collection, and became confused with La Belle Ferronnière by the presence of a ferronnière, a type of accessory worn across the forehead, in the painting as well.

== Attribution ==
Although the model of the painting La Belle Ferronnière is still shrouded in mystery, the landmark exhibition "Leonardo Da Vinci: Painter at the Court of Milan" (National Gallery, London, 9 Nov. 2011 – 5 Feb. 2012) listed the portrait as possibly depicting Beatrice d'Este, wife of Ludovico Sforza. This challenges an earlier identification of the sitter as Lucrezia Crivelli, a mistress of Ludovico. However, Ferronnière could be a reference to Beatrice Sforza's birthplace, the Duchy of Ferrara.

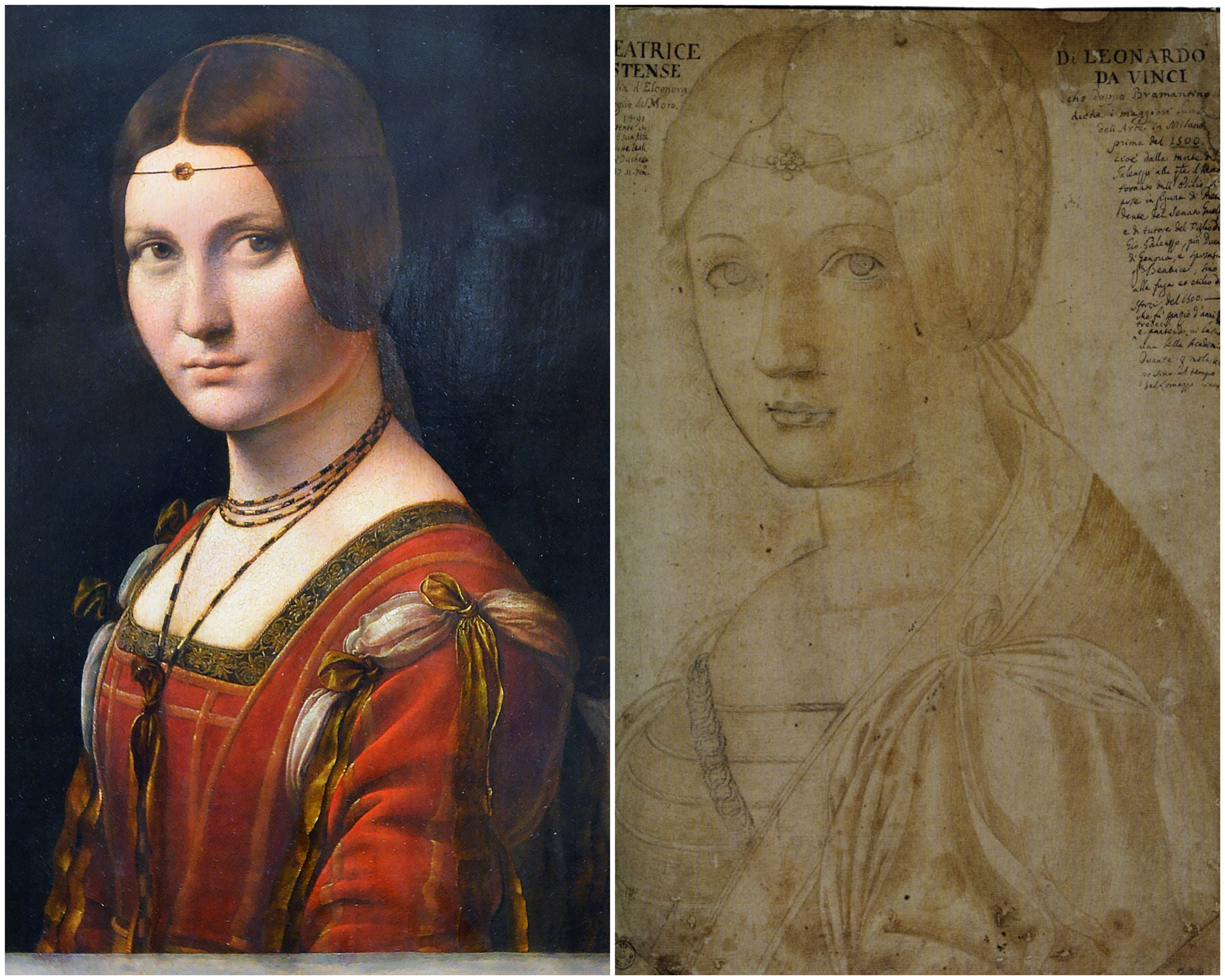
Bella Ferronnière and the alleged portrait of Beatrice d'Este compared: the pose is similar, but the clothing is different; even the look varies significantly.

Karl Morgenstern (1813) and other critics noted some similarities with the drawing number 209 preserved in the Uffizi, executed in lapis and watercolor but retouched a little hard everywhere by a hand of the sixteenth century, which was identified by Father Sebastiano Resta (XVII century) as a portrait of Beatrice d'Este and attributed to Leonardo da Vinci . So also Dalli Regoli (1985), who considered the drawing the copy from a lost original by Leonardo. The most notable similarities are in the clothing and the ornament. The necklace, with its alternating black beading, perhaps references the colors of an ermine and the three strands might reference her three pregnancies.

Bernard Berenson attributed this portrait to Bernardino de' Conti. Giovanni Antonio Boltraffio was suggested by Herbert Cook, who retracted his opinion, seeing Leonardo's own hand, in 1904.

== Copies ==
A later version of the painting, on canvas, had been offered to the Kansas City Art Institute as the original, but was identified as a copy, on the basis of a photograph, by Sir Joseph Duveen, who permitted his remarks to be published in the New York World in 1920; the owner, Mrs Andrée Lardoux Hahn, sued for defamation of property in a notorious court case, which involved many of the major connoisseurs of the day, inspecting the two paintings side by side at the Louvre; the case was eventually heard in New York before a jury selected for not knowing anything of Leonardo or Morellian connoisseurship, and settled for $60,000 plus court expenses, which were considerable. The owner's account, Harry Hahn's The Rape of La Belle (1946) is a classic of populist conspiracy theory applied to the art world. After decades in an Omaha vault, the Hahn La Belle was sold at auction by Sotheby's on January 28, 2010 as "by a follower of Leonardo, probably before 1750"; it brought $1.5 million, a price three times higher than Sotheby's pre-sale estimate. The buyer was an unidentified American collector.

A 19th-century copy of La Belle Ferronnière is conserved in the Musée des beaux-arts, Chambéry. The Louvre painting is identified in pre-Revolutionary inventories of the French royal collection.

== See also ==
- List of works by Leonardo da Vinci
