= San Giovanni in Croce =

San Giovanni in Croce San Giuan in Crus (Lombard)
- Comune
- Comune di San Giovanni in Croce
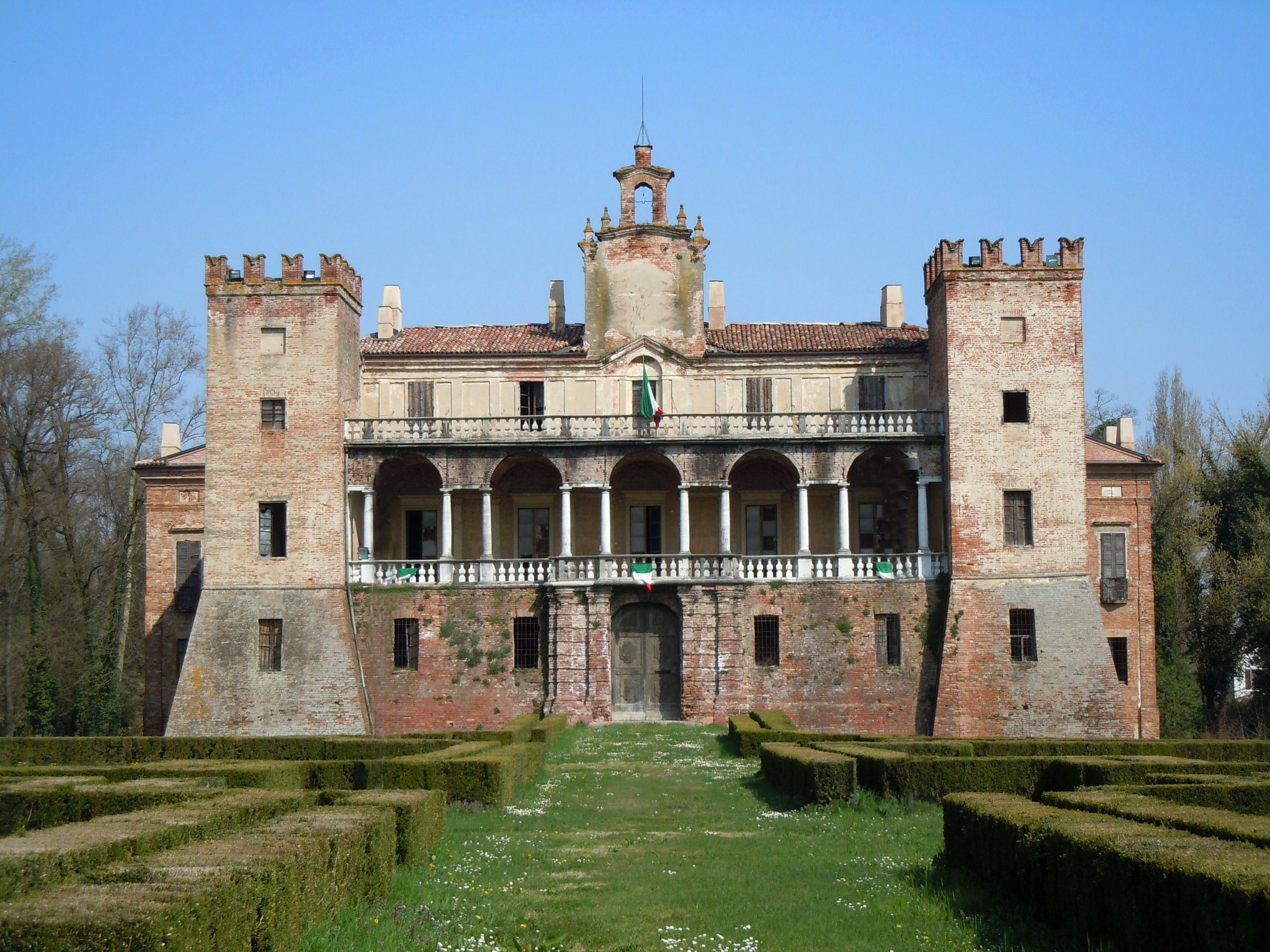

- Location within Italy Location within Lombardy
- Coordinates: 45°5′N 10°22′E
- Country: Italy
- Region: Lombardy
- Province: Cremona (CR)

Government
  - Mayor: Pierguido Asinari

Area
  - Total: 16.1 km^{2} (6.2 sq mi)
- Elevation: 28 m (92 ft)

Population (2018-01-01)
  - Total: 1,784
  - Density: 111/km^{2} (287/sq mi)
- Demonym: Sangiovannesi
- Time zone: UTC+1 (CET)
  - Summer (DST): UTC+2 (CEST)
- Postal code: 26037
- Dialing code: 0375
- Patron saint: St. John the Baptist
- Saint day: 24 June
- Website: Official website

San Giovanni in Croce (Cremunés: San Giuan in Crus) is a comune (municipality) in the Province of Cremona in the Italian region Lombardy, located about 100 kilometres (62 mi) southeast of Milan and about 25 kilometres (16 mi) east of Cremona.

San Giovanni in Croce borders the following municipalities: Casteldidone, Gussola, Martignana di Po, Piadena, Solarolo Rainerio.

== History ==
The earliest records of the comune's origin are found in a deed dated 10 December 1022, in which Marquis Bonifacio of Tuscany is said to be indebted to the bishop of Cremona for some land in Palvareto, the oldest nucleus of San Giovanni, which was located around the old parish church. The term "Palvareto" seems to have an etymology connected with "palus," meaning "swamp," and "vetus," meaning "old".

There was a castle here, which in 1264 the Ermenzoni family sold to Buoso da Dovara. The manor was reinforced in 1341–45 by Bernabò Visconti and then destroyed in 1406 by Cabrino Fondulo.

The latter immediately had a larger castle erected by Maffeo Moro, completed in 1407.

During that century, the lands were disputed between Venice and Milan; although in 1441 an agreement left the castles of Pontevico and San Giovanni to the Milanese, the Venetians, aided by the Gonzagas, stormed the fortress of San Giovanni, retaining it only until 1458, when the Milanese retook it. In 1486 Duke Galeazzo Sforza enfeoffed the castle to Pietro Carminati, Count "Bergamino," whose son Ludovico married Cecilia Gallerani [formerly a favorite of Ludovico il Moro], a poet in Latin and the vernacular, a friend of Gian Giorgio Trissino and Matteo Bandello, who gave rise to a small court of artists.

In 1620, the fief was sold, along with Gussola, to Alfonso de Pimentel; it then passed to the Vidoni and De' Soresina families.

In 1884 the railway station was opened, located on the Parma-Brescia line, and four years later the tramway from Ca' de Soresini to Cremona was opened, which was discontinued in 1928.

In the early twentieth century, a significant textile industry flourished in the village, and a Commercial Credit branch was already operating.

Between 1928 and 1947 San Giovanni in Croce was united with Solarolo Rainerio to form the municipality of Palvareto.

The place-name Palvareto was taken up in the name of the Union of Municipalities Palvareta Nova, established in 2010 for the associated management of services, which includes the municipalities of San Giovanni in Croce, Solarolo Rainerio, San Martino del Lago and Voltido.

In May 2014, after becoming its owner in 2005 and following a major restoration project, the municipality returned to public enjoyment the monumental and naturalistic complex of Villa Medici del Vascello, now a destination for significant cultural tourism attracted, in particular, by the figure of Cecilia Gallerani, the subject of the Lady with an Ermine portrayed by Leonardo da Vinci, who became Countess of San Giovanni in Croce in July 1492.

It was in honor of Cecilia Gallerani that the local municipal theater, which features an interesting Art Nouveau facade, was named in November 2002.

== Demographic evolution ==
Historical population

Year	Pop.	±%
1861	2,099	—
1871	2,451	+16.8%
1881	2,408	−1.8%
1901	2,692	+11.8%
1911	2,657	−1.3%

Year	Pop.	±%
1921	2,711	+2.0%
1931	2,532	−6.6%
1936	2,549	+0.7%
1951	2,447	−4.0%
1961	2,080	−15.0%

Year	Pop.	±%
1971	1,707	−17.9%
1981	1,611	−5.6%
1991	1,523	−5.5%
2001	1,543	+1.3%

Source: Data from ISTAT

== Infrastructure and transportation ==
The station of San Giovanni in Croce, located along the Brescia-Parma railway, is served by regional trains operated by Trenord and cadenced on an hourly basis as part of the service contract stipulated with the Lombardy Region.

Between 1888 and 1928, the same locality was also served by the Ca' de Soresini-San Giovanni in Croce branch line of the Cremona-Casalmaggiore tramway, ultimately operated by the Tramvie Provinciali Cremonesi company
