= Bernardino de' Conti =

Italian painter (1465–1525)

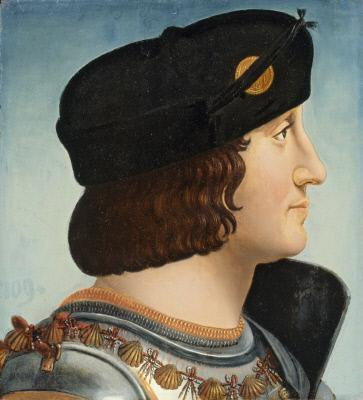
Portrait of Charles d'Amboise on display at the Seattle Art Museum.

Bernardino de 'Conti (di Conti or dei Conti) was an Italian Renaissance painter, born in 1465 in Castelseprio and died around 1525.

He is said to have been born as the son of "master Baldassarre", an obscure painter. Reported to have died in 1525, but the exact year is unknown since little is known about his life past 1522. A close apprentice to Leonardo da Vinci, he is best known for his oil portraits and to a lesser extent, religious renditions such as Madonna and Child.

Bernard Berenson argued that La Belle Ferronnière should be attributed to Bernardino de 'Conti, not Leonardo da Vinci.

== Biography ==
Probably born in Castelseprio, in the province of Varese, he moved to Milan in 1494. His first commissions came at an early age with records showing payment for works Magister Bernardin de Comittibus de Castroseprio, filius magistri Baldessaris, port of Cumane, Parochie S. Protaxi intus, pintor mediolanensis, and for an altarpiece representing the Virgin and Child, intended for the Church of San Pietro in Gessate in Milan.

It's assumed that Bernardino moved to France in his early 30's. Between 1508 and 1522 he painted a series of oil portraits; many of them are now considered masterpieces. Through his work it is assumed that he temporarily lived-in, or was a frequent guest at Château d'Amboise, the home of Leonardo da Vinci (1516–1519). This is evidenced by the several portraits of Charles II d'Amboise, governor of Milan under Louis XII. Through this connection he was commissioned to paint multiple portraits for the Trivulzio family, Francesco Sforza (Vatican Pinacoteca), of Sisto della Rovere (Gemäldegalerie, Berlin), among others.

In 1522, he completed a Madonna, exhibited for a long time in Potsdam, but destroyed in 1945. After this date, the documentation on Bernardino remains uncertain.

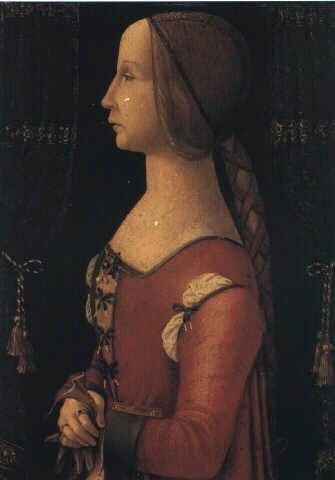
Portrait of an affluent woman. Rumored to be sitter for Leonardo da Vinci's La Belle Ferronnière and Lady with an Ermine.

== List of artwork ==
His works are most often paintings of devotion. He is also credited with the portrait of Charles II d'Amboise, lord of Chaumont, Meillant and Charenton – there is another version of it made by Andrea Solari, another apprentice of da Vinci.

Bernardo Di' Conti paintings.

- Berlin. Gallery. Profile of a Prelate. 1499.
- Beatrice d'Este, The Duchess of Milan (fragment), c. 1500
- Charles II D'Amboise Portrait, "The Earl of Douglas Surnamed Black" (multiple versions)
  - Charles II d'Amboise in Saint-Vic museum
- Madonna and Child (auctioned by Sothebys in 2019)
- Vierge à l'enfant sur fond de paysage
- Ritratto Di Gentiluomo
- Portrait of Catellano Trivulzio
- Giovanni Ambrogio de Predis
- Gentleman of the Trivulzio Family

An original version of de' Conti's 'Earl of Douglas' was owned by Henry VIII (Whitehall Palace no. 774) and was listed among his art inventory. It is currently part of the Royal Family's art collection.

His work has been featured in museums which include the New York's Metropolitan Museum of Art (the MET), the British Museum, Harvard Museum, Seattle Museum of Art, Brooklyn Museum, and several others.

== Gallery ==
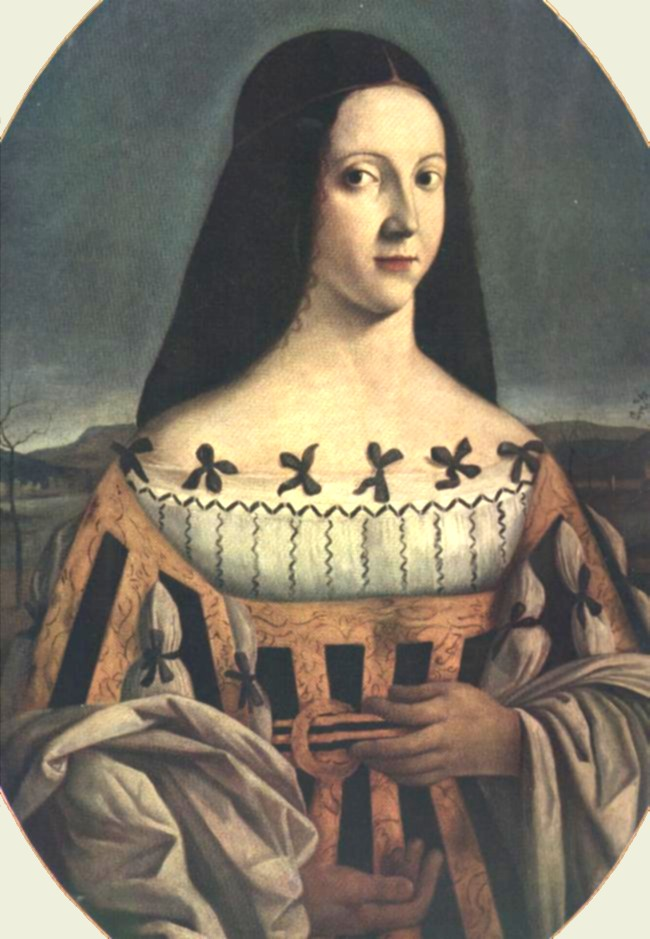
Beatrice D'Este, The Duchess of Milan who inspired multiple William Shakespeare sonnets and play Beatrice, Much Ado About Nothing.

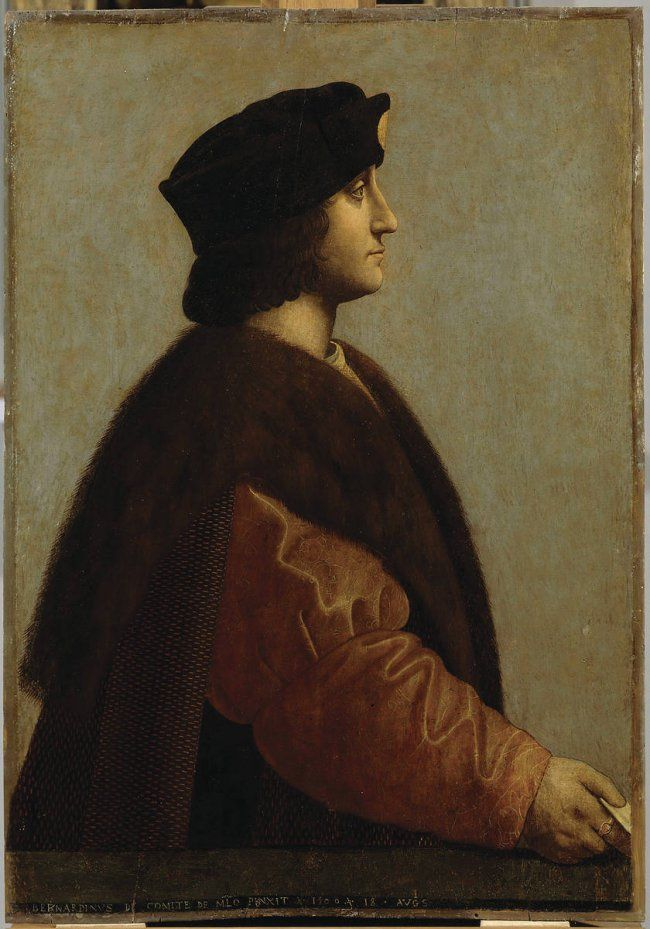
Large oil portrait of Charles II d'Amboise (1473-1511)

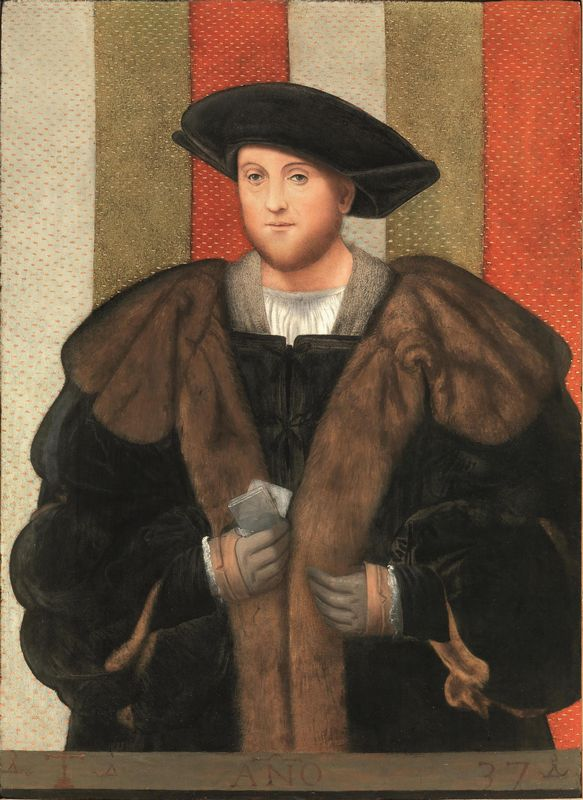
(Francesco) Sforza family member portrait on wood panel (c. 1505)

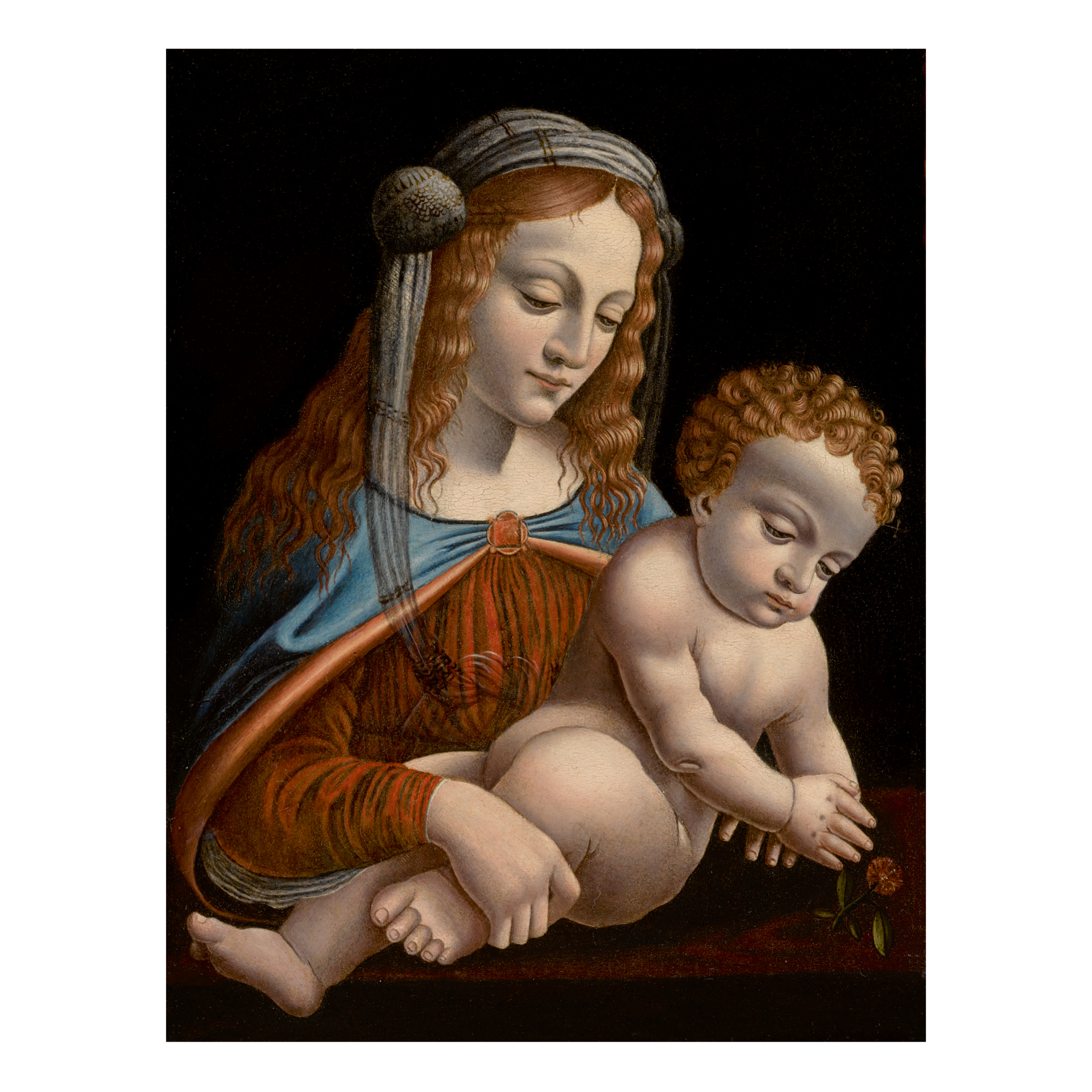
Madonna and Child Renaissance Painting. Attributed to Bernardino de Conti, in manner of Leonardo da Vinci.

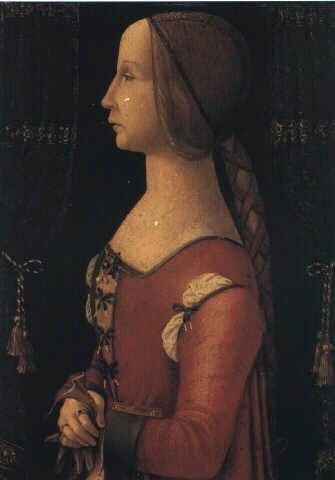
Oil Painting in manner of Leonardo da Vinci

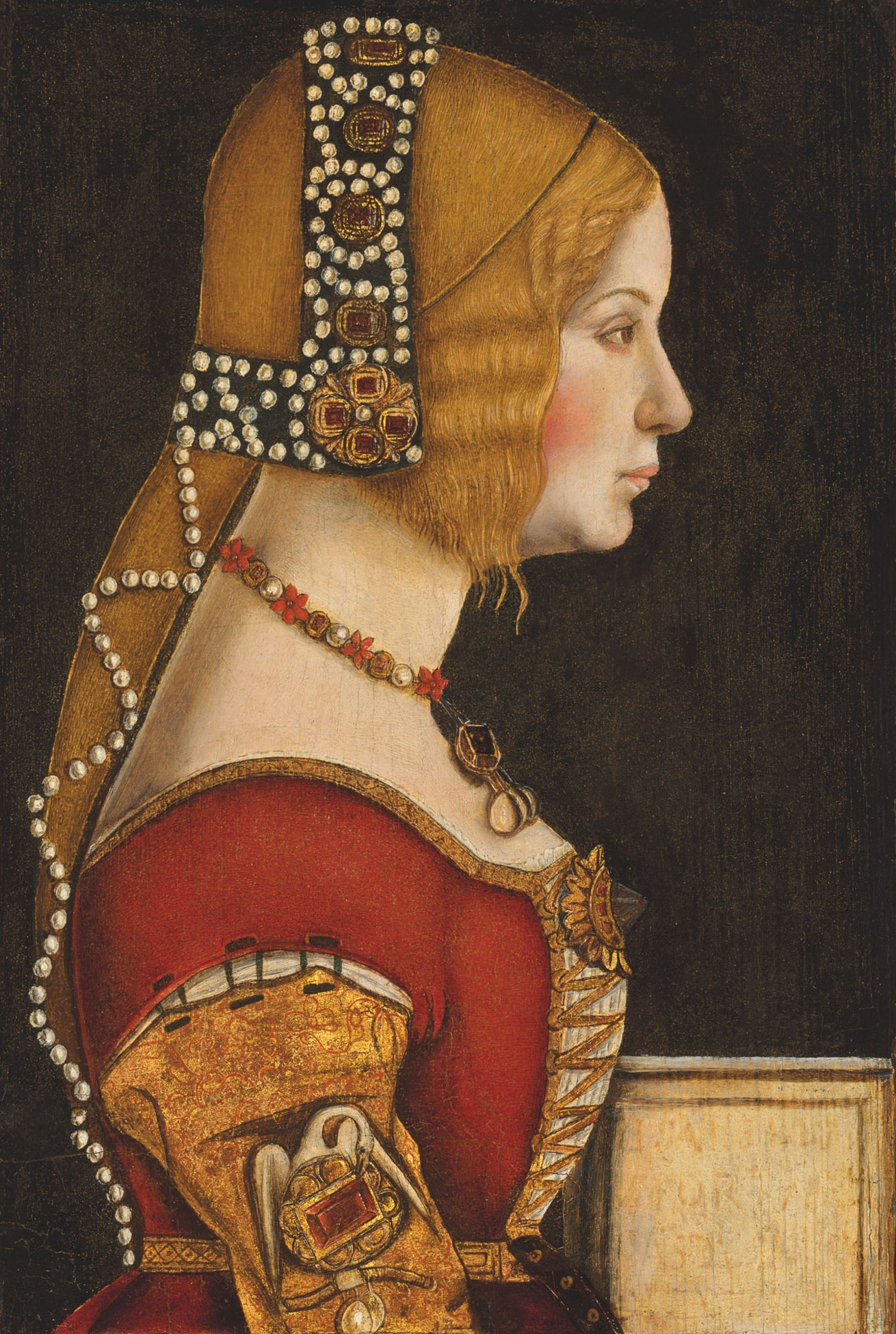
Isabella of Aragon portrait on wood panel.

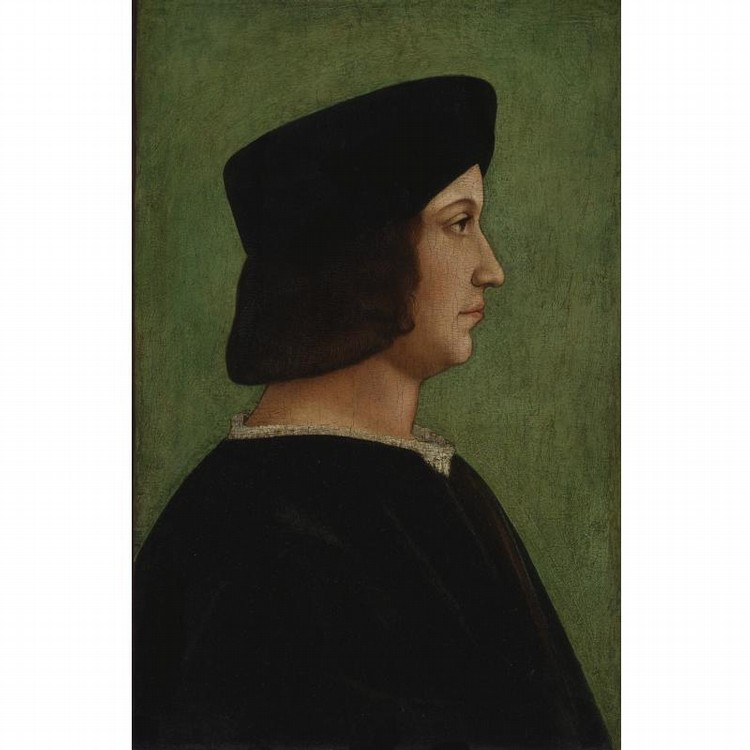
Oil Painting, attrib. Bernardino de' Conti from Pavia, Italy. Sold at Sothebys Auction 2007

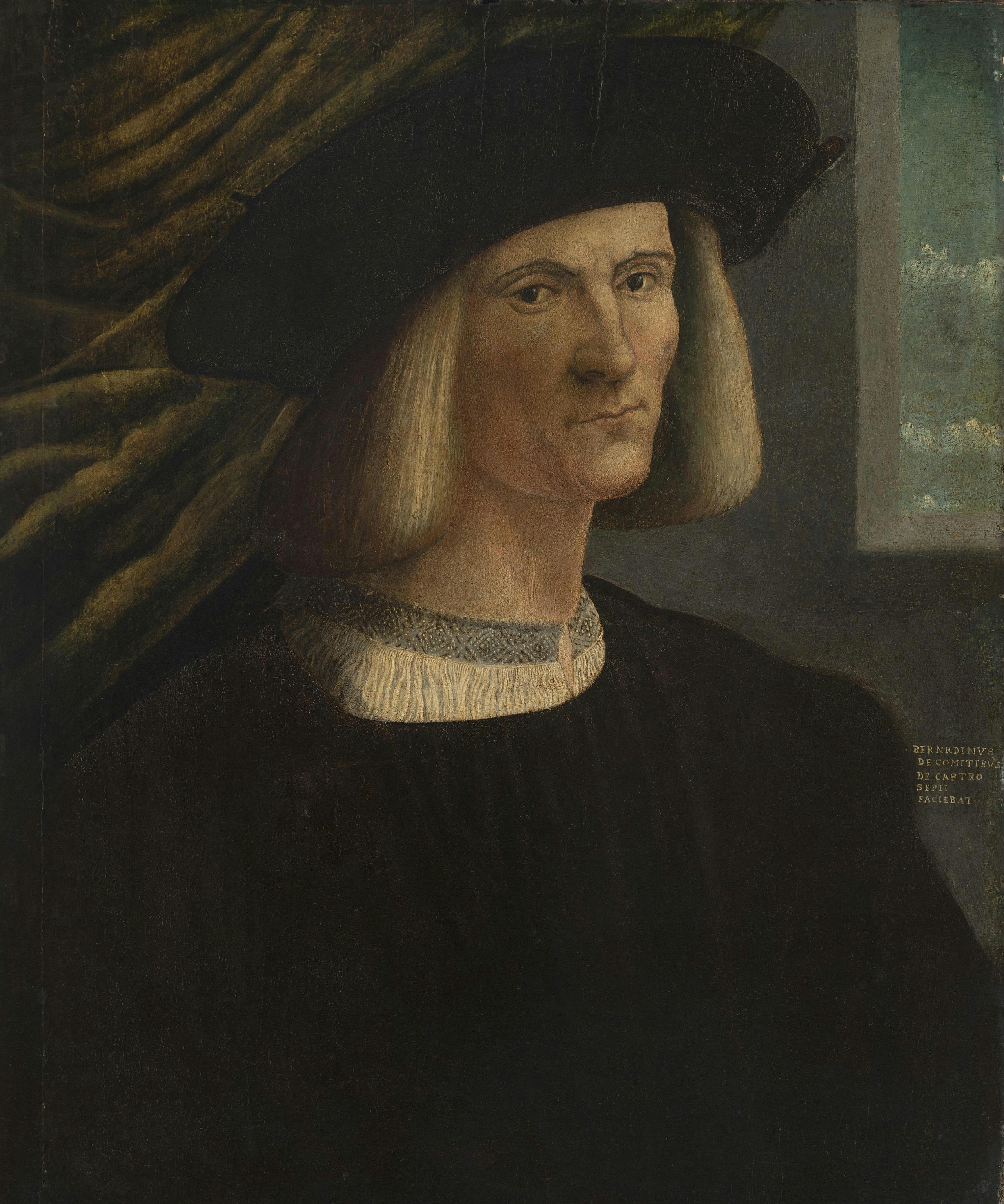
Renaissance portrait of an Italian gentleman (c. 1510). Displayed at the Philadelphia Museum.

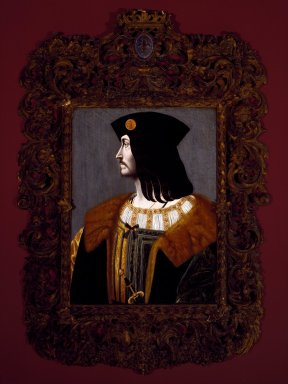
Renaissance portrait of an affluent gentlemen in Milan, Italy (c. 1505). Displayed at the Brooklyn Museum.

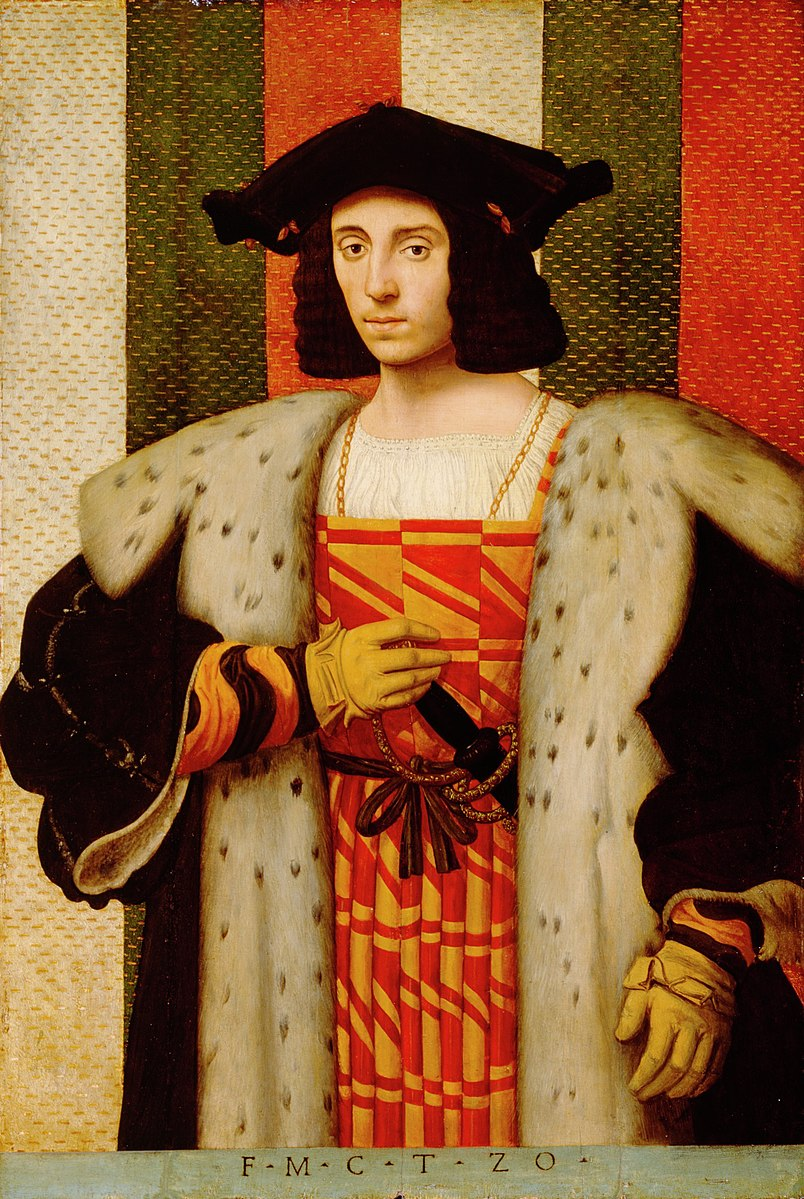
Gentleman of the Trivulzio Family (c. 1450 - 1528)

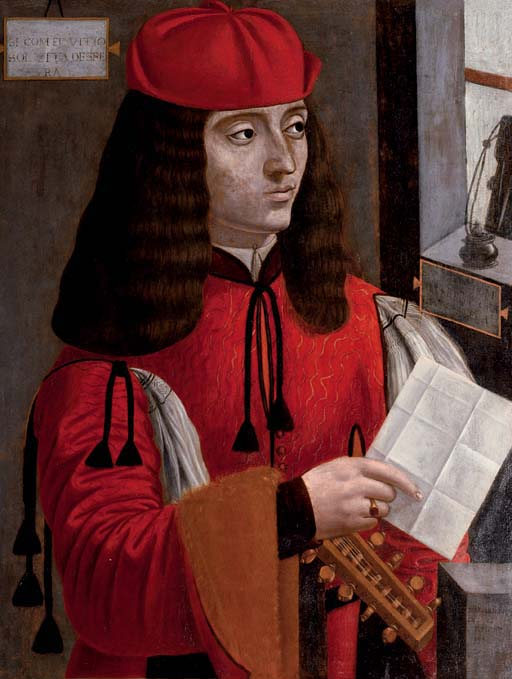
Portrait of a 15th-century Cardinal holding instrument and note.

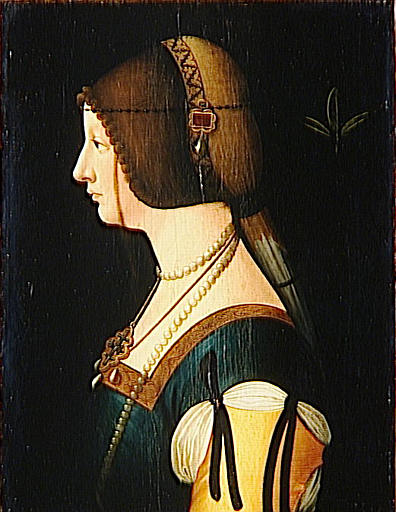
Bianca Maria Sforza painting acquired by Louvre Museum in France (1914).

== Death ==
The last documented artwork by Bernardino was "Virgin with the Child" in 1522. Historians have stated that he likely died in 1525.
