= Spineda =

- Comune
- Comune di Spineda
- Coat of arms

- Location within Italy Location within Lombardy
- Coordinates: 45°4′N 10°31′E
- Country: Italy
- Region: Lombardy
- Province: Cremona (CR)

Government
  - Mayor: Davide Caleffi

Area
  - Total: 10.3 km^{2} (4.0 sq mi)

Population (Dec. 2004)
  - Total: 620
  - Density: 60/km^{2} (160/sq mi)
- Time zone: UTC+1 (CET)
  - Summer (DST): UTC+2 (CEST)
- Postal code: 26030
- Dialing code: 0376
- Website: Official website

Spineda is a comune (municipality) in the Province of Cremona in the Italian region Lombardy, located about 110 kilometres (68 mi) southeast of Milan and about 40 kilometres (25 mi) east of Cremona.

Spineda borders the following municipalities: Commessaggio, Gazzuolo, Rivarolo del Re ed Uniti, Rivarolo Mantovano, Sabbioneta, San Martino dall'Argine.

== Demographic evolution ==
Historical population

Year	Pop.	±%
1861	793	—
1871	818	+3.2%
1881	901	+10.1%
1901	981	+8.9%
1911	956	−2.5%

Year	Pop.	±%
1921	1,066	+11.5%
1931	1,093	+2.5%
1936	1,089	−0.4%
1951	1,121	+2.9%
1961	923	−17.7%

Year	Pop.	±%
1971	781	−15.4%
1981	697	−10.8%
1991	639	−8.3%
2001	620	−3.0%

Source: Data from ISTAT
