= Casteldidone =

Casteldidone Casteldidòon (Lombard)
- Comune
- Comune di Casteldidone
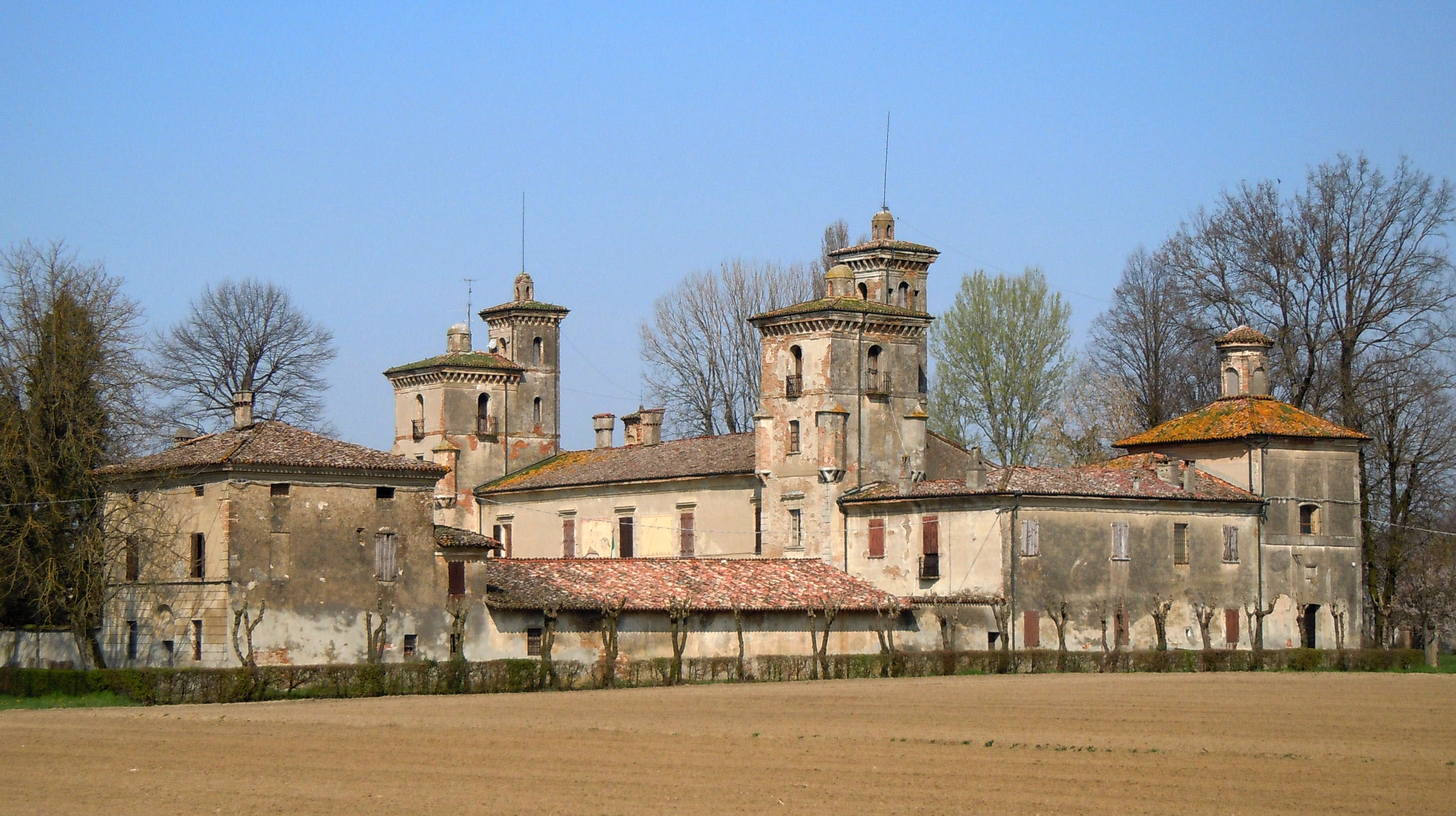
- Palazzo Mina della Scala

- Coat of arms

- Location within Italy Location within Lombardy
- Coordinates: 45°4′N 10°24′E
- Country: Italy
- Region: Lombardy
- Province: Cremona (CR)

Government
  - Mayor: Pierromeo Vaccari

Area
  - Total: 10.8 km^{2} (4.2 sq mi)
- Elevation: 27 m (89 ft)

Population (31 July 2014)
  - Total: 593
  - Density: 54.9/km^{2} (142/sq mi)
- Demonym: Casteldidonesi
- Time zone: UTC+1 (CET)
  - Summer (DST): UTC+2 (CEST)
- Postal code: 26030
- Dialing code: 0375
- Website: Official website

Casteldidone (Cremunés: Casteldidòon) is a comune (municipality) in the Province of Cremona in the Italian region Lombardy, located about 110 kilometres (68 mi) southeast of Milan and about 30 kilometres (19 mi) east of Cremona.

Casteldidone borders the following municipalities: Casalmaggiore, Martignana di Po, Piadena, Rivarolo del Re ed Uniti, Rivarolo Mantovano, San Giovanni in Croce.
