= Ferronnière =

Type of headband

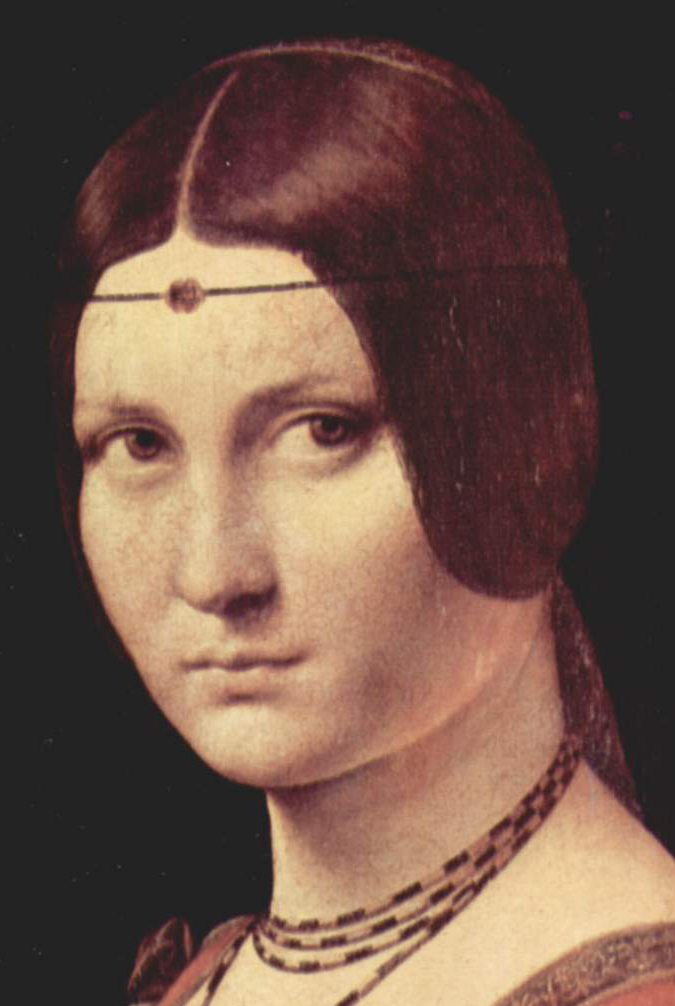
Detail from La Belle Ferronnière, school of Leonardo da Vinci, 1490–1496

A ferronnière ([fɛʁ.ɔn.jɛʁ]) is a style of headband that encircles the wearer's forehead, usually with a small jewel suspended in the centre. The original form of the headband was worn in late fifteenth-century Italy, and was rechristened a ferronnière at the time of its revival in the second quarter of the nineteenth century for both day and (more frequently) formal and evening wear.

== Etymology ==
The term ferronnière for describing such headbands was probably coined in the early nineteenth century. Merriam-Webster date the earliest use of the term to 1831, and the Oxford English Dictionary notes that their record of the earliest usage of the term is located in a mid-19th-century publication called World of Fashion. Some sources suggest that the term was contemporary to the 1490s.

The ferronnière is often said to be named after a 1490s portrait attributed to the school of Leonardo da Vinci, the La belle ferronnière, where the sitter wears such an ornament. However, this painting's title was assigned in the 18th century, well after it was painted, under the erroneous assumption that it portrayed Madame Le Féron, a reputed mistress of Francis I of France; or another mistress who was allegedly an iron merchant's wife. The literal translation of ferronnière in English is "female ironmonger;" the term was used for the wife or daughter of an ironmonger. In their catalogue, the Louvre suggest that La belle ferronnière was so-called because of her forehead ornament, a theory that is supported by other scholars, but other sources conclude that the ornament was named after the painting, due to the term's specific application apparently not existing prior to the 19th century.

== In fashion ==
The original ornament that later became called a ferronnière was popular in 15th-century Italy, where it could be made from metal or jewels.

The nineteenth-century ferronnière was worn from the late 1820s to the early 1840s, when it was considered to enhance a high forehead, and by the 1850s, it had fallen out of fashion. One contemporary source from 1831 describes the ferronnière as "a small plait of hair, adorned in the centre of the forehead by a large brilliant, from which depends another brilliant of the pear shape." It has been described as one of the most widely worn examples of historicism in early Victorian fashion, worn as a tribute to the Renaissance alongside beaded belts called cordelières inspired by medieval clothing and hairstyles named after historic women such as Agnès Sorel and Blanche of Castile. The ferronnière could be worn for either day or evening. Alternative terms for similar ornaments were the bandelette and the tour de tête.

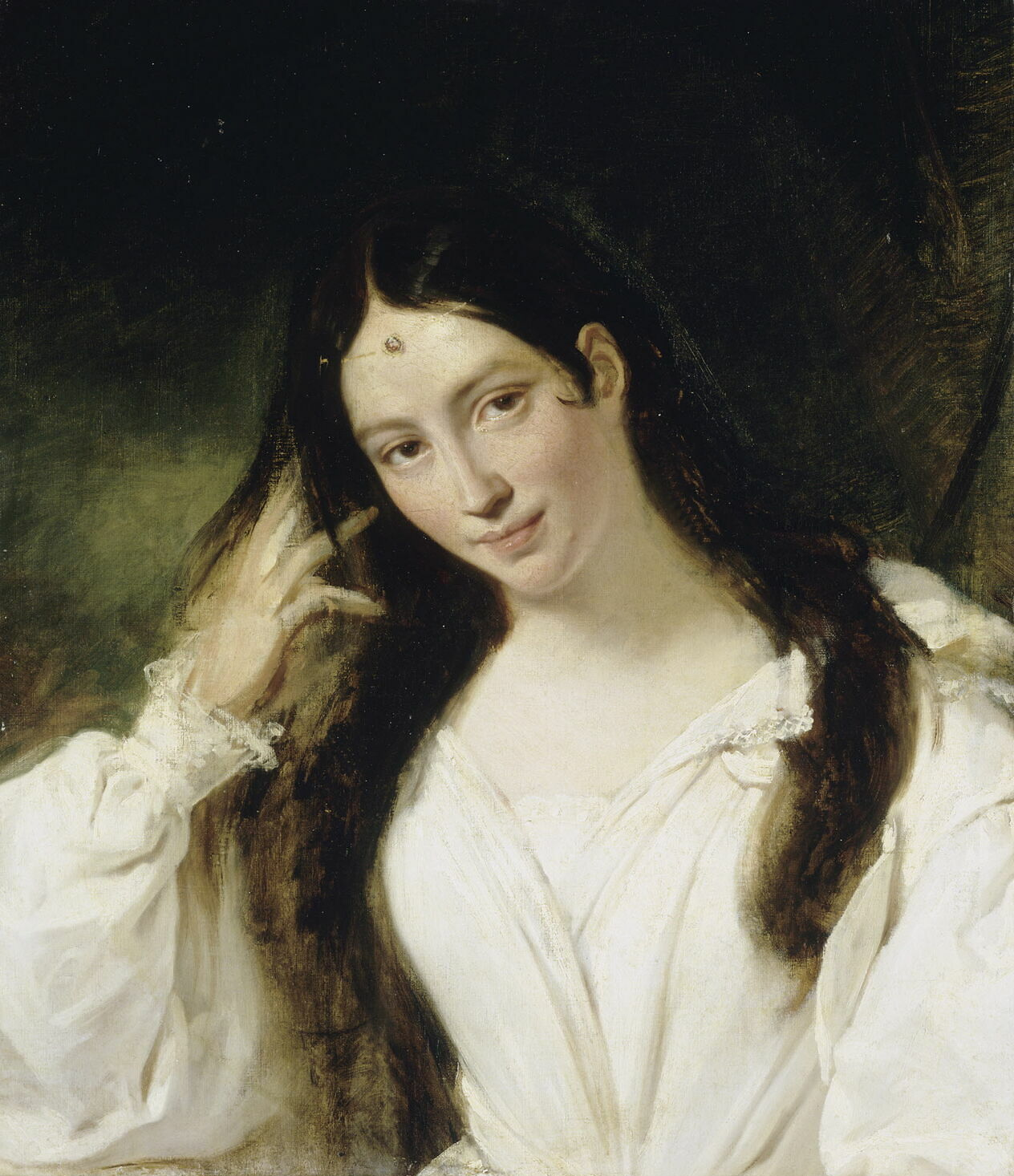
La Malibran as Desdemona, François Bouchot, circa 1830

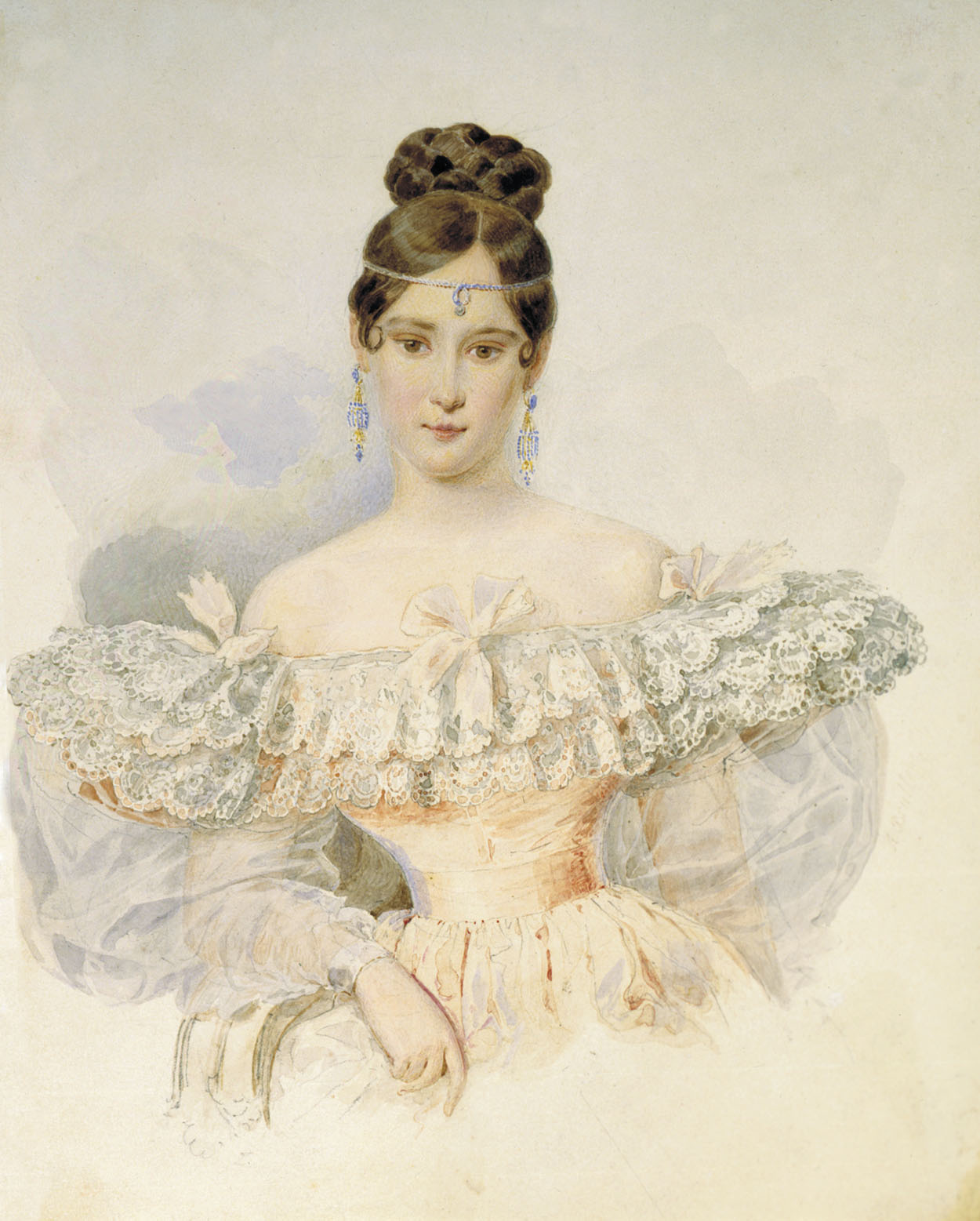
Portrait of Natalia Pushkina, Alexander Brullov, 1831–1832
