= Martignana di Po =

- Comune
- Comune di Martignana di Po
- Coat of arms

- Location within Italy Location within Lombardy
- Coordinates: 45°0′N 10°22′E
- Country: Italy
- Region: Lombardy
- Province: Cremona (CR)

Government
  - Mayor: Alessandro Gozzi

Area
  - Total: 14.7 km^{2} (5.7 sq mi)
- Elevation: 26 m (85 ft)

Population (28 February 2017)
  - Total: 2,018
  - Density: 137/km^{2} (356/sq mi)
- Demonym: Martignanesi
- Time zone: UTC+1 (CET)
  - Summer (DST): UTC+2 (CEST)
- Postal code: 26040
- Dialing code: 0375
- Website: Official website

Martignana di Po (Casalasco-Viadanese: Martgnàna) is a comune (municipality) in the Province of Cremona in the Italian region Lombardy, located about 110 kilometres (68 mi) southeast of Milan and about 30 kilometres (19 mi) southeast of Cremona.

Martignana di Po borders the following municipalities: Casalmaggiore, Casteldidone, Colorno, Gussola, San Giovanni in Croce, Sissa Trecasali.
