= Tornata =

- Comune
- Comune di Tornata
- Location within Italy Location within Lombardy
- Coordinates: 45°6′N 10°26′E
- Country: Italy
- Region: Lombardy
- Province: Province of Cremona (CR)

Area
  - Total: 10.3 km^{2} (4.0 sq mi)

Population (Dec. 2004)
  - Total: 522
  - Density: 50.7/km^{2} (131/sq mi)
- Time zone: UTC+1 (CET)
  - Summer (DST): UTC+2 (CEST)
- Postal code: 26030
- Dialing code: 0375

Tornata (Cremunés: Turnada) is a comune (municipality) in the Province of Cremona in the Italian region Lombardy, located about 110 kilometres (68 mi) southeast of Milan and about 30 kilometres (19 mi) east of Cremona. As of 31 December 2004, it had a population of 522 and an area of 10.3 square kilometres (4.0 mi^{2}).

Tornata borders the following municipalities: Bozzolo, Calvatone, Piadena, Rivarolo Mantovano.

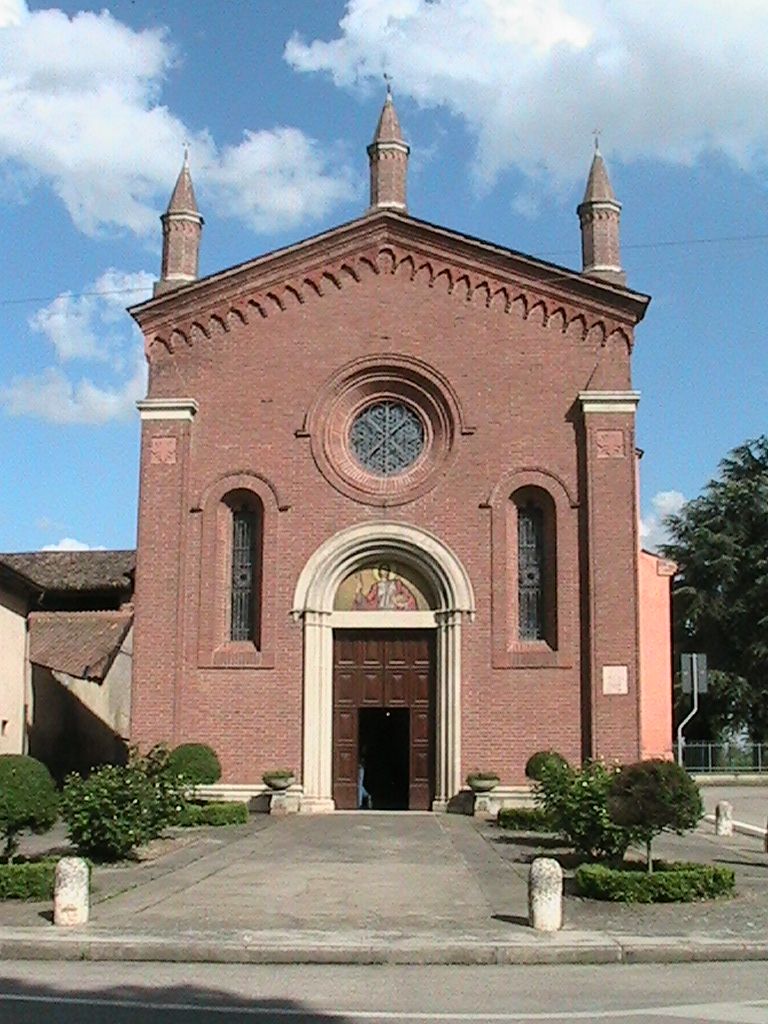
Building in Tornata

== Demographic evolution ==
Historical population

Year	Pop.	±%
1861	844	—
1871	981	+16.2%
1881	991	+1.0%
1901	1,089	+9.9%
1911	1,108	+1.7%

Year	Pop.	±%
1921	1,132	+2.2%
1931	1,071	−5.4%
1936	1,079	+0.7%
1951	1,100	+1.9%
1961	973	−11.5%

Year	Pop.	±%
1971	654	−32.8%
1981	530	−19.0%
1991	504	−4.9%
2001	521	+3.4%

Source: Data from ISTAT
