= Municipal Theater Cecilia Gallerani =

Theater and opera house in San Giovanni in Croce, Italy

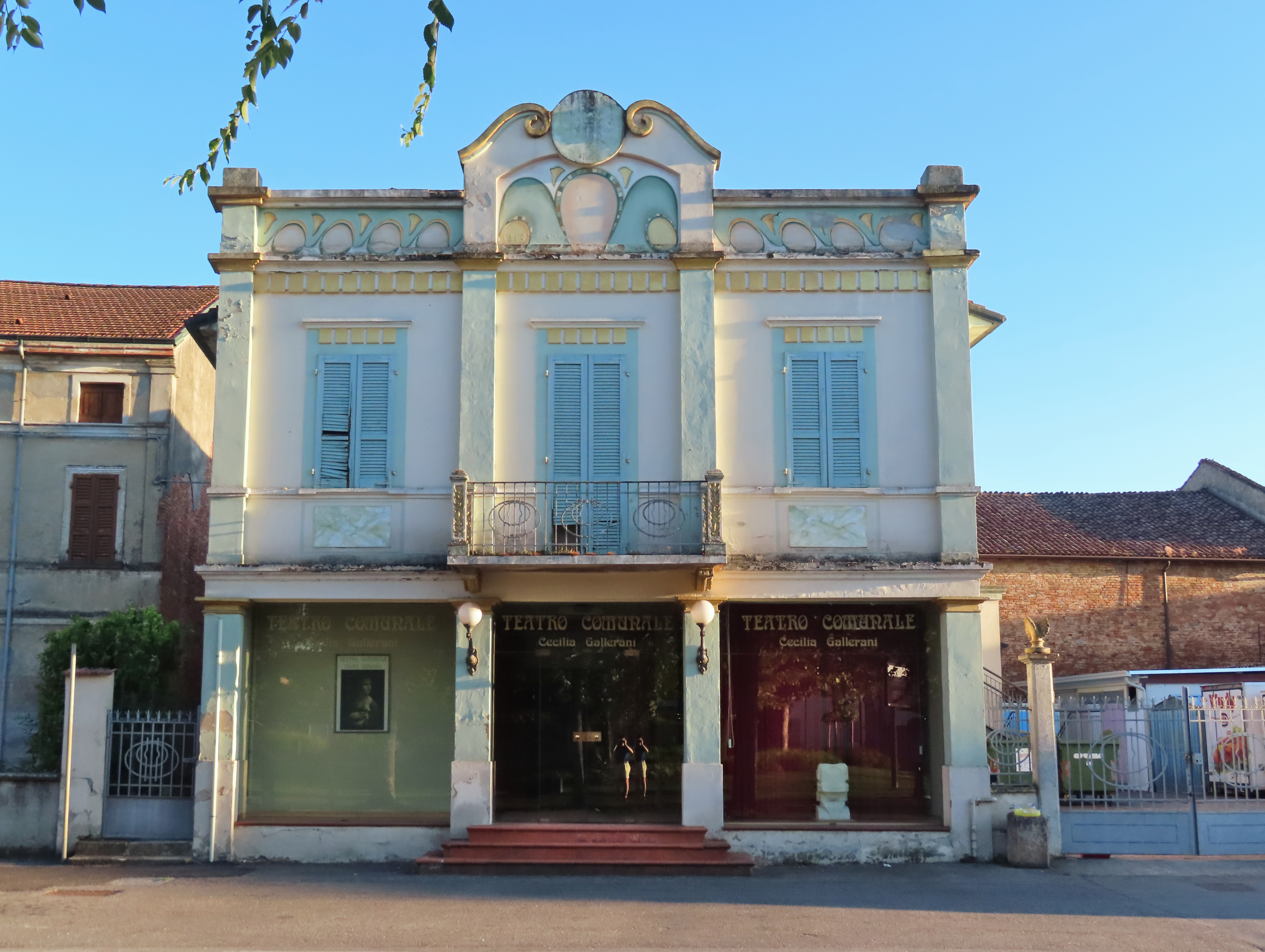
- Exterior of Teather Cecilia Gallerani
- Interactive map of Municipal Theater Cecilia Gallerani
- Address: San Giovanni in Croce, Via Grasselli Barni; Italy
- Coordinates: 45°04′37″N 10°22′28″E
- Owner: Municipality of San Giovanni in Croce
- Capacity: 223

Construction
- Opened: 1923
- Reopened: 1932
- Rebuilt: 1983
- Years active: actuality

The Municipal Theater Cecilia Gallerani is a small theater and opera house located in San Giovanni in Croce, Italy. Since 2002, it has been dedicated to Cecilia Gallerani, the woman immortalized by Leonardo da Vinci in the portrait Lady with an Ermine.

== History ==
The history of this theater begins on 3 March 1923, when the fascist society La Patriottica purchased the land on which the building was to be constructed. After La Patriottica 's bankruptcy, the theater was purchased in 1932 by the municipality of San Giovanni in Croce, then still called Palvareto (a municipality created in 1928 from the merger of San Giovanni in Croce and Solarolo Rainerio, then dissolved in 1947).

Since its purchase by the municipality, the theater flourished until the 1960s, a period during which its gradual decline and abandonment began, lasting until the 1980s. In 1983, it was finally restored and returned to its original function. The theater's official inauguration took place on May 14, 1983.

In 2002, the theater was officially dedicated to Cecilia Gallerani, who married count Ludovico Carminati di Brembilla, feudal lord of San Giovanni in Croce, in 1492. The couple lived in what is now the Villa Medici del Vascello.

After several restorations, it regained its full functionality and has 223 seats, including 168 in the stalls and 55 in the gallery, as well as a 54 m² stage. It hosts theater and music festivals, as well as cultural events.
