= Galleani =

Galleani is a surname. Notable people with the surname include:

- Ely Galleani (born 1953), Italian film actress
- Luigi Galleani (1861–1931), Italian anarchist active in the United States

== See also ==
- Galleanists
- Gallerani
