= Detail (work of art) =

Isolated element within a work of art

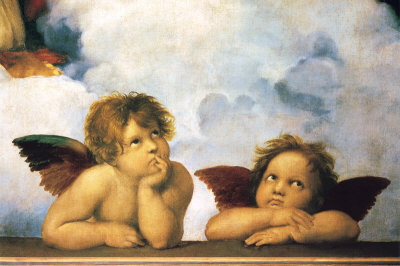
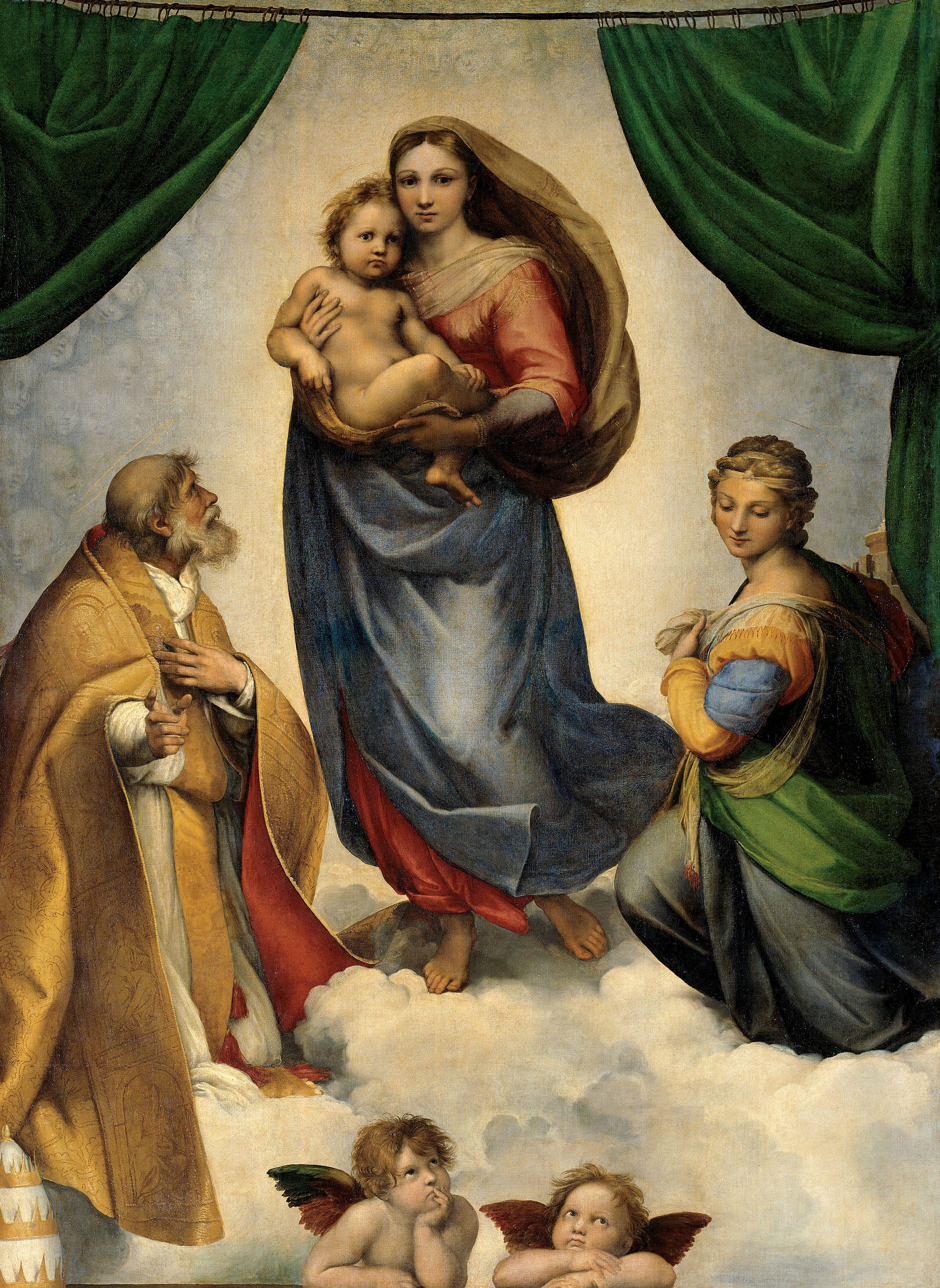

A detail is an isolated element within a work of art, particularly from a painting, sculpture or building.

== Overview ==
A detail is distinct from the general composition of a work of art. The art historian Jennifer Raab of Yale University describes it as inherently contradictory: "it can delineate difference or emphasize unity". She furthers that "the detail always points away from itself to something else–to other parts of a picture, to the work of art as a whole".

When a detail is reproduced, this is noted in the work of art's caption.
