= Laura Morelli =

American novelist

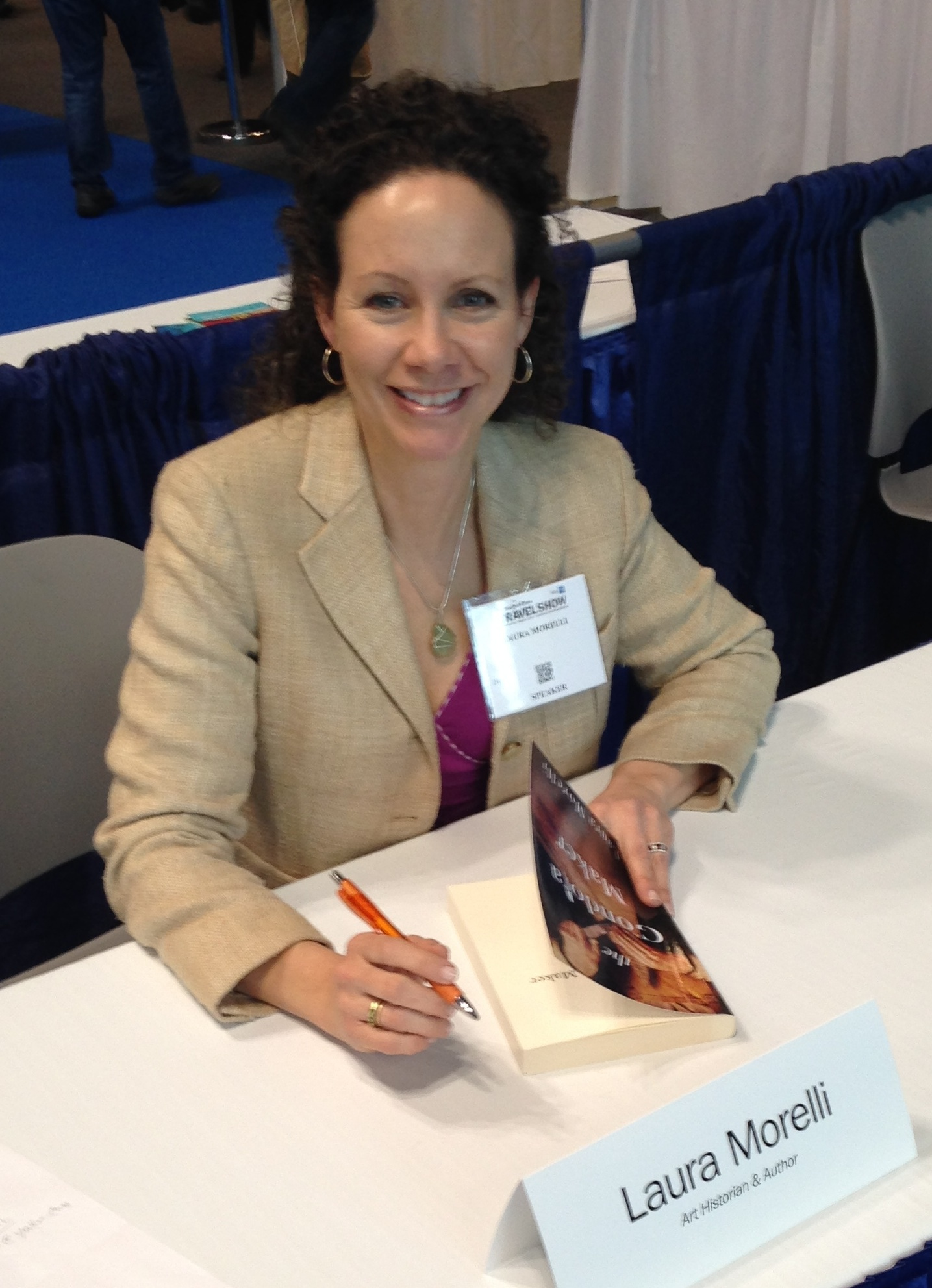
- Laura Morelli at the New York Times Travel Show
- Occupations: Art historian, historical novelist
- Website: Official author website

Laura Morelli is an American art historian and a USA Today bestselling author of historical fiction set mostly in Italy.

== Career ==
After beginning a career teaching art history at the college level, Laura Morelli began to capture stories of traditional artisans across Italy. She has been a visiting scholar at the American Academy in Rome and an art history commentator for the History Channel. Morelli has been a Contributing Editor to National Geographic Traveler and has written for USA Today, Departures, and other travel publications. She also contributes lessons to TED-Ed. Her historical fiction focuses on topics of art history. The Gondola Maker debuted with a starred review in Publishers Weekly. The historical novel earned an IPPY Award and a Benjamin Franklin Digital Award.

== Bibliography ==
=== Fiction ===
- Morelli, Laura (2025). The Keeper of Lost Art. Harper Collins (William Morrow). ISBN 978-0063206014.
- Morelli, Laura (2023). The Last Masterpiece. Harper Collins (William Morrow). ISBN 978-0063205987.
- Morelli, Laura (2021). The Stolen Lady: A Novel of WWII & the Mona Lisa. Harper Collins (William Morrow). ISBN 978-0062993595.
- Morelli, Laura (2020). The Night Portrait: A Novel of WWII & Da Vinci's Italy. Harper Collins (William Morrow). ISBN 978-0062993571.
- Morelli, Laura (2020). The Giant: A Novel of Michelangelo's David. The Scriptorium. ISBN 978-1942467366.
- Morelli, Laura (2017). The Painter's Apprentice. The Scriptorium. ISBN 978-1942778929.
- Morelli, Laura (2016). Bridge of Sighs. The Scriptorium. ISBN 9781942778950.
- Morelli, Laura (2015). The Tapestry. The Scriptorium. ISBN 9781942778998.
- Morelli, Laura (2014). The Gondola Maker. Laura Morelli. ISBN 9780989367127.

=== Nonfiction ===
- Morelli, Laura, ed. (2027). Giorgio Vasari Lives of the Artists. Translated by Morelli, Laura. Princeton University Press. ISBN 9780691296692.
- Morelli, Laura (2015). Made in Naples & the Amalfi Coast. Authentic Arts Publishing. ISBN 9781942467083.
- Morelli, Laura (2016). Artisans of Naples & the Amalfi Coast. ISBN 9781942467113.
- Morelli, Laura (2015). Made in Venice. Laura Morelli. ISBN 9780989367134.
- Morelli, Laura (2015). Artisans of Venice. ISBN 9780989367189.
- Morelli, Laura (2015). Made in Florence. Authentic Arts. ISBN 9781942467021.
- Morelli, Laura (2015). Artisans in Florence. ISBN 9781942467052.
- Morelli, Laura (2008). Made in France. Rizzoli / Universe. ISBN 9780789316905.
- Morelli, Laura (2006). Made in the Southwest. Rizzoli / Universe. ISBN 9780789313829.
- Morelli, Laura (2008). Made in Italy. Rizzoli / Universe. ISBN 9780789316998.

== Personal life ==
Morelli was raised on the coast of Georgia. She received a bachelor's degree from the University of Georgia and a master's degree in the History of Art & Architecture from Tufts University. She earned a Ph.D. in Art History from Yale University.
