= House of Carminati =

Carminati Carminati di Valbrembilla Carminati di Brembilla Carminati di Brambilla
- Noble house
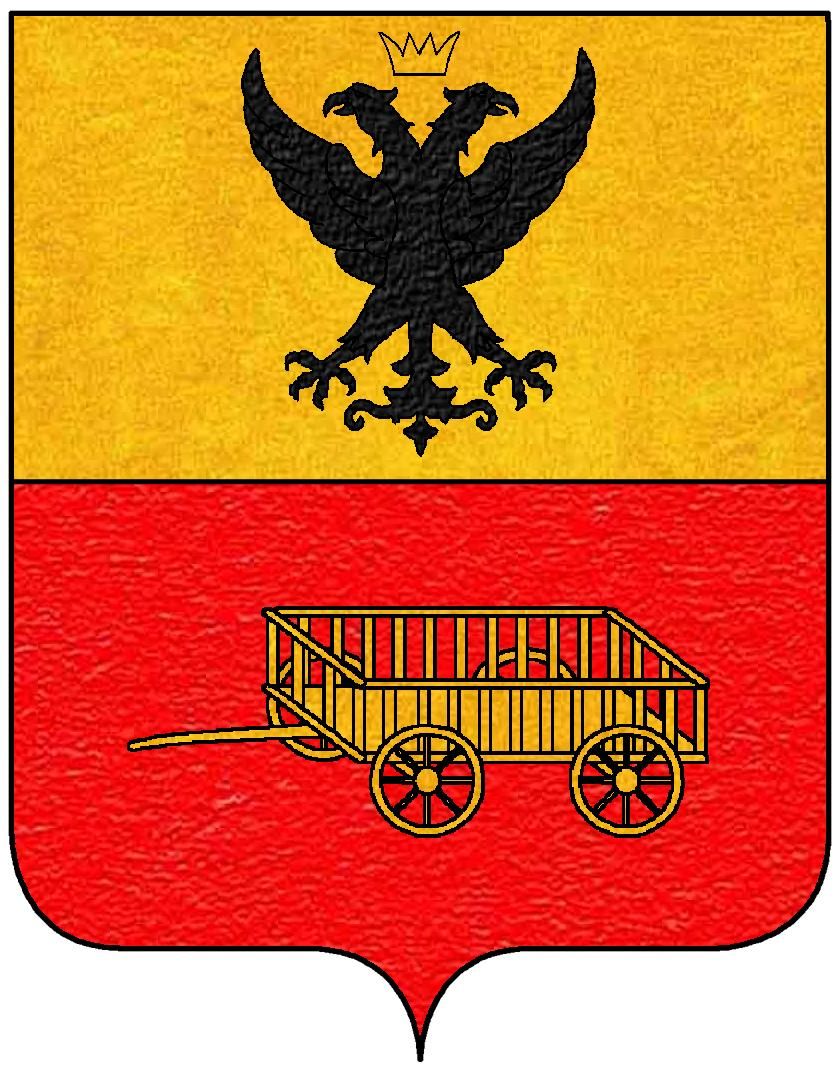
- Coat of arms of the House of Carminati Motto: "Hope" (Italian: Spero)
- Country: Italy
- Founded: ~1006; 1020 years ago
- Founder: Pietro Carminati della valle Brembilla
- Titles: "Count of Brembilla"; "Knight"
- Estates: Ubione Castle (main); Casa Eminente; Monastero Di San Salvaro

The Carminati family is a Bergamese family originally based in Val Brembilla. The first known reference to the Carminati was in a message from Pope John XVIII to Pietro Carminati della valle Brembilla in 6 January 1006 where the Pope, between other privileges, conceded to Pietro's son, Giacomo, the possibility of succession of the Bishop of Bergamo and to each member of the House of Carminati and its descendants the title of Knights and Counts for "valor demonstrated against the enemies of the faith of Christ and extension of the same ....".

During the Wars in Lombardy in 19 January 1443, the Carminati and other families were exiled from Val Brembilla in an event known as "La cacciata dei Brembillesi".

== Surname Carminati ==
=== Origin ===
Characteristic of the north-central Lombardy region, the surname likely originated from a nickname denoting those connected to the sanctuary or lands of Carmine—a name prevalent among Lombardy's religious communities.

=== History ===
This family has had particular relevance in the affairs of its territory for many centuries. During the Wars in Lombardy, the Carminati sided with the Ghibellines, fought against the Guelphs, and even defied the wrath of the Duke of Milan and the Republic of Venice. The latter took possession of the city of Bergamo and its territory, destroying all the villages in the valley in 1443. The Carminati were forced into exile, seeking refuge mainly in Milan. There, they divided into three main lines, forming three different houses: one known as Count Bergamini of San Giovanni in Croce, another living in Vigevano with the surname Brambilla, decorated with the Marchional title by Emperor Charles VI; and the third still flourishing in Milan with the name Carminati de Brambilla, attributed to the patriciate in the 18th century. They also spread to Genoa, Verona, and Venice, where they were assigned to the patriciate in 1687.

=== Surname Popularity (2014) ===
==== Carminati ====
1. Italy (15657)
2. Brazil (1959)
3. France (1706)
4. United States (337)
5. Argentina (248)

==== Carminatti ====
1. Brazil (2473)
2. Argentina (160)
3. Uruguay (105)
4. Croatia (14)
5. United States (10)

=== Brazil ===
It may be surprising that the Italian last name has such popularity in Brazil. Nevertheless, this is largely due to the promotion of migration to the country beginning in 1875, primarily to the south of Brazil. The need for more laborers due to the Feijó’s Law, which decreased the slave trade, prompted the promotion of immigrants by the Empire of Brazil.

Thus, this created Italian colonies in the rural areas of Brazil, with a boom happening between 1880 and 1900 with almost 1 million Italians arriving to Brazil to become farmers. However, due to the ban of subsidized immigration to Brazil by Prinetti Decree, immigration rates then declined and instead increased in Argentina starting from 1903 to 1920.

== Notes ==
- Colleoni, Celestino [in Italian] (1617). Historia quadripartita di Bergamo et suo territorio - Volume I, Chapter 7 (in Italian).
- Belotti, Bortolo [in Italian] (1940). Storia di Bergamo e dei Bergamaschi (in Italian).
