= Rivarolo del Re ed Uniti =

- Comune
- Comune di Rivarolo del Re ed Uniti
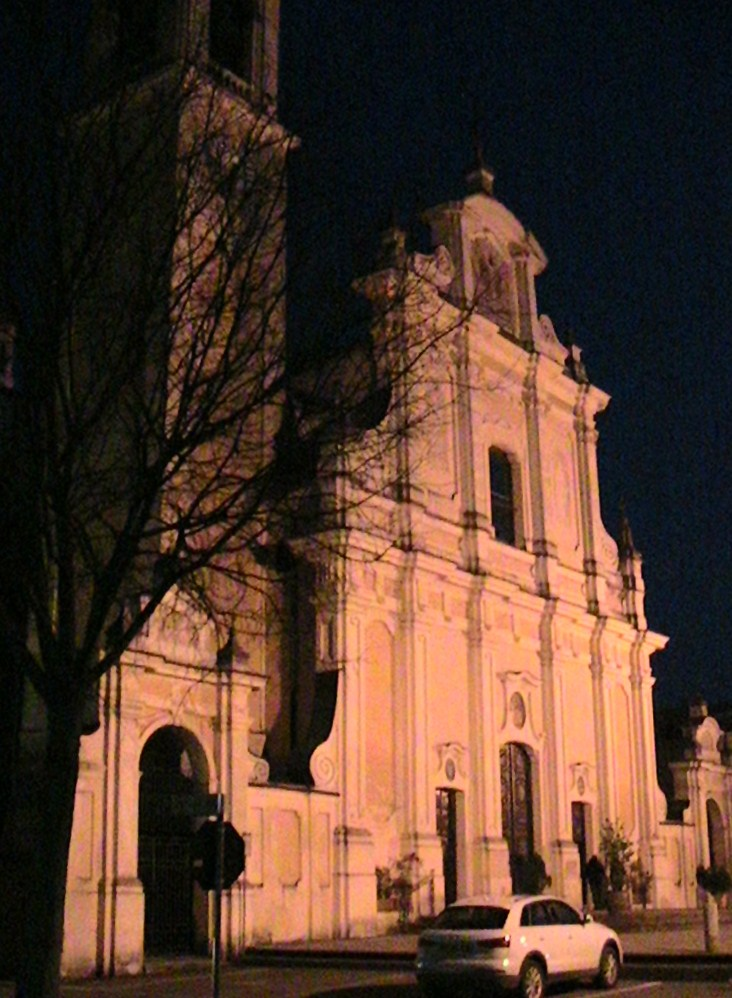
- Church of San Zeno at Rivarolo.

- Coat of arms

- Location within Italy Location within Lombardy
- Coordinates: 45°1′N 10°28′E
- Country: Italy
- Region: Lombardy
- Province: Cremona (CR)
- Frazioni: Brugnolo, Villanova

Government
  - Mayor: Marco Vezzoni

Area
  - Total: 27.3 km^{2} (10.5 sq mi)
- Elevation: 22 m (72 ft)

Population (28 February 2017)
  - Total: 1,986
  - Density: 72.7/km^{2} (188/sq mi)
- Demonym: Rivarolesi
- Time zone: UTC+1 (CET)
  - Summer (DST): UTC+2 (CEST)
- Postal code: 26036
- Dialing code: 0375
- Website: Official website

Rivarolo del Re ed Uniti (Casalasco-Viadanese: Rivaról) is a comune (municipality) in the Province of Cremona in the Italian region Lombardy, located about 110 kilometres (68 mi) southeast of Milan and about 35 kilometres (22 mi) southeast of Cremona.

Rivarolo del Re ed Uniti borders the following municipalities: Casalmaggiore, Casteldidone, Rivarolo Mantovano, Sabbioneta, Spineda.
