= Rivarolo Mantovano =

Rivarolo Mantovano Riaröl (Emilian)
- Comune
- Comune di Rivarolo Mantovano
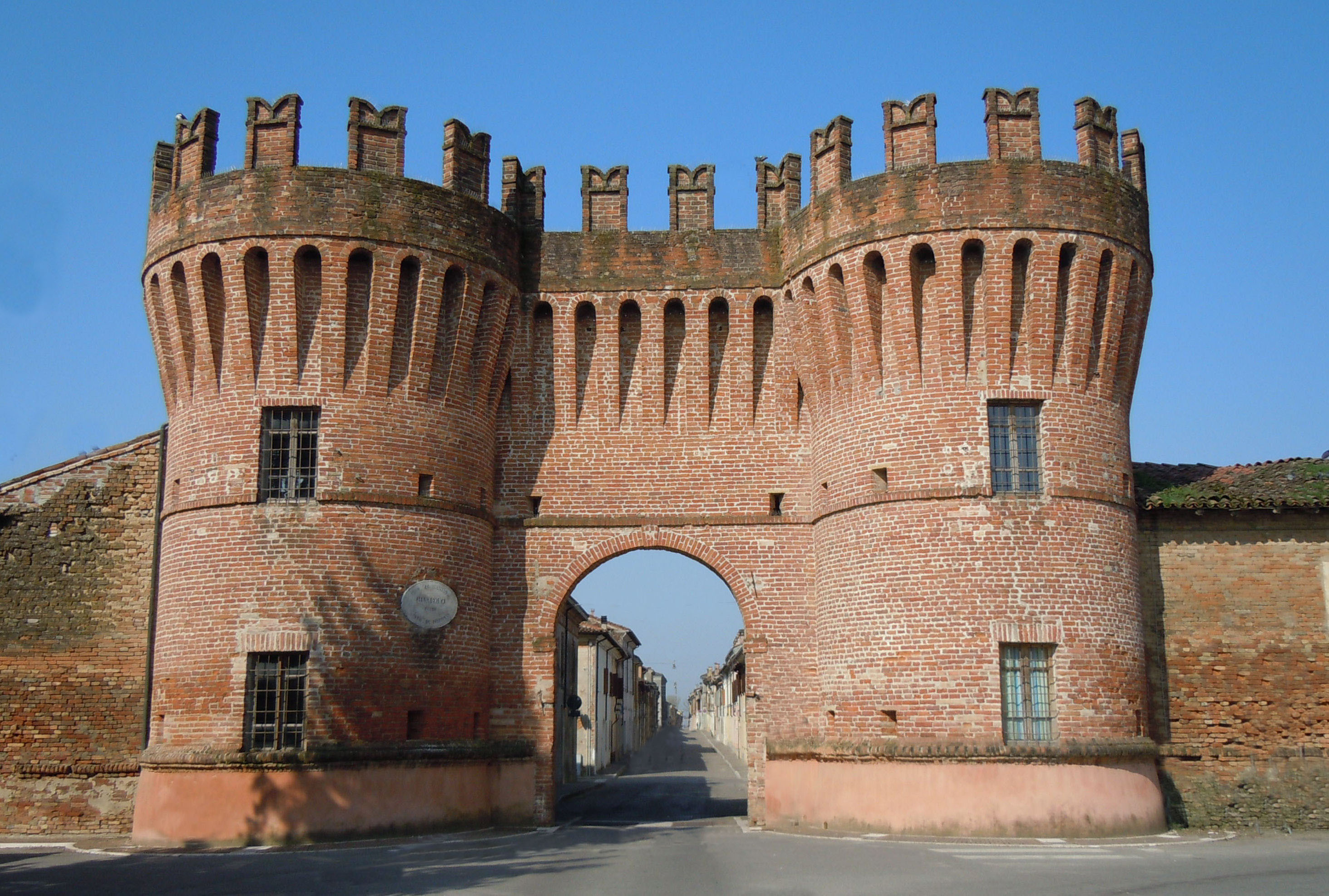

- Coat of arms

- Location within Italy Location within Lombardy
- Coordinates: 45°4′N 10°26′E
- Country: Italy
- Region: Lombardy
- Province: Mantua (MN)
- Frazioni: Cividale Mantovano

Government
  - Mayor: Massimiliano Galli

Area
  - Total: 25.5 km^{2} (9.8 sq mi)
- Elevation: 26 m (85 ft)

Population (28 February 2017)
  - Total: 2,578
  - Density: 101/km^{2} (262/sq mi)
- Demonym: Rivarolesi
- Time zone: UTC+1 (CET)
  - Summer (DST): UTC+2 (CEST)
- Postal code: 46017
- Dialing code: 0376
- Website: Official website

Rivarolo Mantovano (Mantovano: Riaröl), known as Rivarolo di Fuori until 1907, is a comune (municipality) in the Province of Mantua in the Italian region of Lombardy, located about 110 kilometres (68 mi) southeast of Milan and about 30 kilometres (19 mi) southwest of Mantua. Established by duke Vespasiano I Gonzaga in the late 16th century, the town has a squared plan and perpendicular roads.

Rivarolo Mantovano borders the following municipalities: Bozzolo, Casteldidone, Piadena, Rivarolo del Re ed Uniti, San Martino dall'Argine, Spineda, Tornata.
