= Cecilia Gallerani =

Mistress of Ludovico Sforza (1473–1536)

- Cecilia Gallerani as the Lady with an Ermine, painted by Leonardo da Vinci around 1489 and displayed at the Czartoryski Museum in Kraków
- Born: early 1473; Siena, Republic of Siena
- Died: 1536 (aged 62–63); Castle of San Giovanni in Croce, near Cremona, Duchy of Milan
- Known for: Being the subject of Leonardo da Vinci's painting Lady with an Ermine; Being the mistress of Ludovico Sforza, Duke of Milan
- Spouse: Ludovico Carminati de' Brambilla (m. 1492; died 1514)
- Children: 6
- Parents: Fazio Gallerani (father); Margherita Busti (mother)

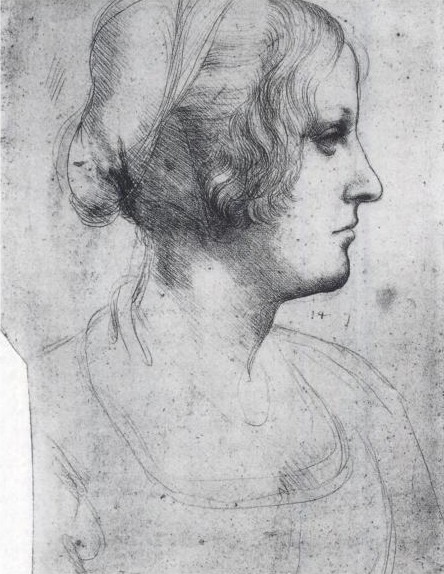
Drawing of Gallerani by Leonardo

Cecilia Gallerani (Italian pronunciation: [tʃeˈtʃiːlja ɡalleˈraːni]; early 1473 – 1536) was the favourite and most celebrated of the many mistresses of Ludovico Sforza, known as Lodovico Il Moro, Duke of Milan. She is best known as the subject of Leonardo da Vinci's painting Lady with an Ermine (c. 1489). While posing for the painting, she invited Leonardo, who at the time was working as court artist for Sforza, to meetings at which Milanese intellectuals discussed philosophy and other subjects. Gallerani herself presided over these discussions.

== Family and early life ==
Cecilia was born in early 1473 into a large family from Siena. Her father's name was Fazio Gallerani. He was not a member of the nobility, but he occupied several important posts at the Milanese court, including the position of ambassador to Republic of Florence and Republic of Lucca. Her mother was Margherita Busti, the daughter of a noted doctor of law.

She was educated alongside her six brothers in Latin and literature. In 1483 at the age of ten, Cecilia was betrothed to Stefano Visconti, but the betrothal was broken off in 1487 for unknown reasons. In May 1489, she left home for the Monastero Nuovo, and it was possibly there that she met Ludovico.

== Mistress of Ludovico Sforza ==
Gallerani was a lifelong scholar with a musical gift and love of poetry, which she composed in Latin and Italian. She became a mistress of the Duke of Milan, Ludovico Sforza "il Moro" when she was 16 or 18 and enjoyed entertaining the intellectual elite out of her apartments in his Milanese castle and seat of the ducal court at the Porta Giovia. It is supposed that she was Sforza's preferred partner but too low in social rank to be a politically acceptable match; after their son Cesare was born on 3 May 1491, Sforza continued to provide for the family with palatial homes, an arranged marriage for Gallerani with an Italian count, and senior church appointments for Cesare in Milan.

Gallerani and son continued to live in Castello Sforza for up to a year, around when the duke's long-negotiated marriage to a daughter of the Duke of Ferrara (and niece of the Queen of Hungary) could be celebrated. The 16-year-old Duchess Beatrice d'Este discovered the liaison and insisted on their removal. They were first installed in the Verme Palace until Gallerani was given a palace in Carmagnola in 1492, when she married the son of a duke of the House of Carminati who had pledged service to Sforza.

=== Lady with an Ermine ===
Although at times the details have been disputed, Leonardo da Vinci's famous lifelike portrait is considered by experts to be of Cecilia Gallerani while she still lived in Castello Sforzeco; in 1992 Shell and Sironi concluded it to have been painted around 1490 by cross-referencing and correcting the interpretation of contemporaneous evidence. Leonardo was the Castello Sforza court artist and engineer, yet it is believed he never painted the Duchess, which could mean she refused her own sitting on the basis of insult relating to the mistress. (He later painted other mistresses and the second wife of Sforza.) Da Vinci used the ermine/stoat as a symbol of purity in his works and wrote about its meaning. But other theories on its meaning include that it is a play on Cecilia's last name and the Greek word for the animal (gallay) and/or an emblem of Sforza, whose sobriquet became 'l'Ermellino' after being awarded the Order of the Ermine by the King of Naples. Art critics have noted that the skulls and hands/paws of the two figures are remarkably similar and these subtle details not only a testament to the skill of Da Vinci but also a hint at symbolism.

The academic disagreements over the year and subject of the painting (but not its authenticity) owe to a lack of artifacts describing the work before its purchase in 1800 by Polish Prince Adam Jerzy Czartoryski as a gift to his mother Princess Isabella. But correspondence exists about a portrait of Gallerani once borrowed by Isabella d'Este who was herself a known admirer of da Vinci's artwork. In her reply to the request, Gallerani said it no longer looked like her because she had been so young then and "nobody seeing it and me together would suppose it was made for me". "Though reluctant because it no longer resembled her, Cecilia complied, and by the following month the picture was gratefully returned".

== Later life, death, and legacy ==
The Countess and Count Ludovico "Il Bergamino" were given a palace, as their wedding gift by Duke Sforza in 1492. They had five children. After the deaths of both her son in 1512 and husband in 1515, she retired to San Giovanni in Croce, a castle near Cremona that had been enfeoffed to the Count's father by the Duke.

Gallerani died on an unknown date in 1536. She was purportedly buried in the Carminati family tomb in the Church of San Zavedro in San Giovanni in Croce.

Bandello described her as a patron of the arts. According to others, her salon was the first in Europe.

== Issue ==
By her lover Ludovico Sforza, she had a son:

- Cesare Sforza (3 May 1493 – 4 January 1514), a cleric who was made the abbot of the Church of San Nazaro Maggiore of Milan in 1498 and became canon of Milan in 1505.

By her husband, she had four sons and a daughter:

- Giovan Pietro, Earl of San Giovanni in Croce; he married Bona Monastirolo, daughter of Lucrezia Crivelli (another former mistress of Ludovico Sforza) and her husband;
- Girolamo;
- Francesco; in 1534 he married Isabella Sforza (1503–1561), natural daughter of Giovanni Sforza, but the marriage was declared nullius for "spiritual relative" (his mother was Isabella's godmother); he later married Ludovica Secca;
- Ascanio;
- Maria Felice; she married Anchise Visconti d'Aragona, lord of Oleggio Castello.

== Cultural references ==
The Leonardo portrait of Gallerani plays an important role in the plot of the alternative historical novel Fatherland by Robert Harris. In the novel, the painting is misappropriated by corrupt Nazi officials during World War II. The book's epilogue states that in real life, the portrait "was recovered from Germany at the end of the war and returned to Poland."

The portrait also takes center stage in the novel The Night Portrait by Laura Morelli. The novel splits timelines between the late 1400s to depict Leonardo painting the portrait, and the 1940s, as the Nazis and the "Monument Men" contend over the painting.

In San Giovanni in Croce there's a little theater dedicated to her.
