= Lady with an Ermine =

Painting by Leonardo da Vinci, 1489–1491

- Dama con l'ermellino (Italian), Dama z gronostajem (Polish)
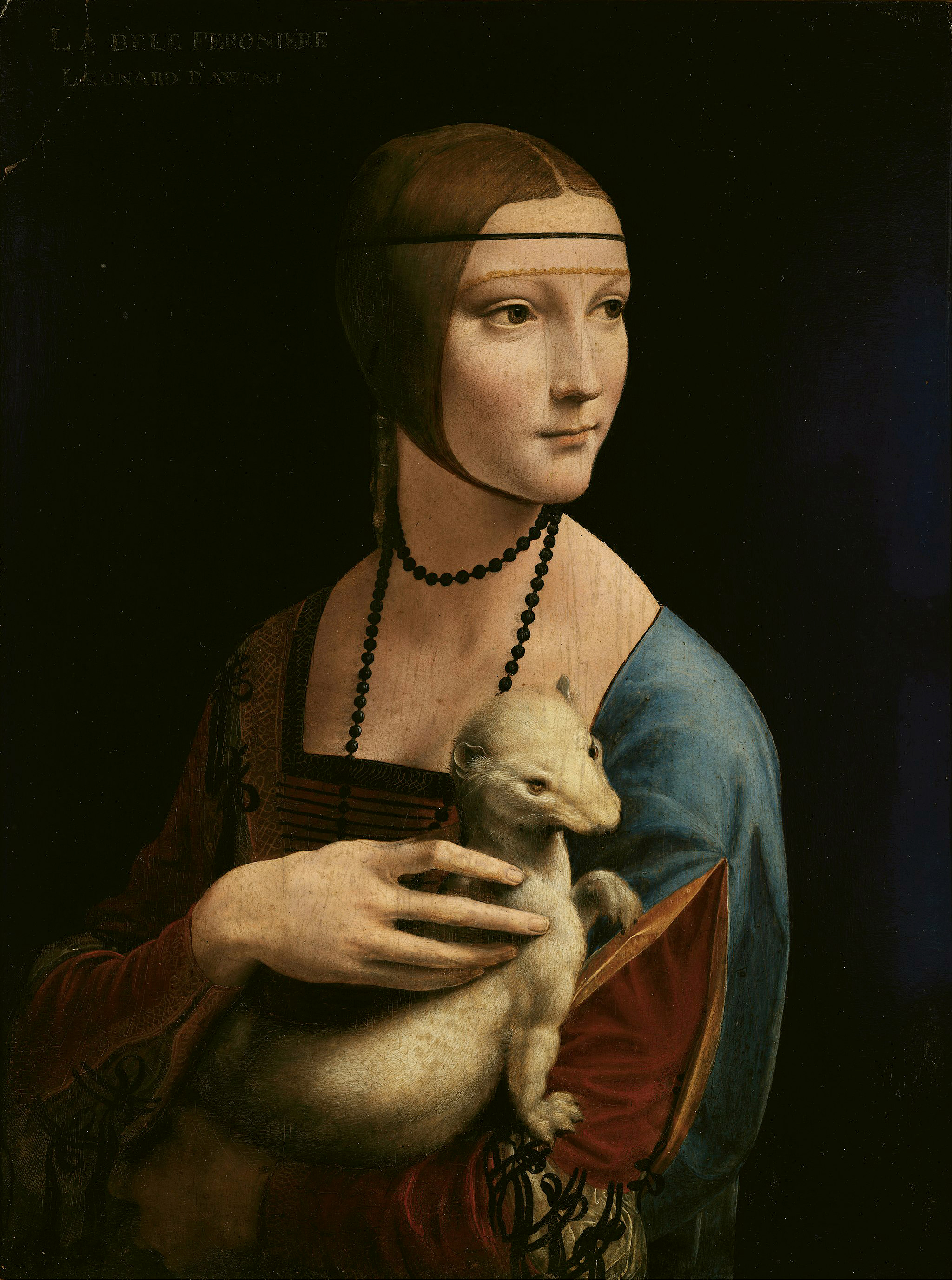
- Artist: Leonardo da Vinci
- Year: 1489–1491
- Medium: Oil on walnut panel
- Subject: Cecilia Gallerani
- Dimensions: 54.8 cm × 40.3 cm (21.6 in × 15.9 in)
- Location: Czartoryski Museum, Kraków, Poland

The Lady with an Ermine (Note: The work is most commonly known as the Lady with an Ermine (Italian: Dama con l'ermellino [ˈdaːma kon lermelˈliːno]; Polish: Dama z gronostajem). It is sometimes known as the Portrait of Cecilia Gallerani, the Portrait of an Unknown Woman, the Lady with a Ferret, or the Lady with a Marten.) is a portrait painting by the Italian Renaissance artist Leonardo da Vinci. Dated to c. 1489–1491, the work is painted in oils on a panel of walnut wood. Its subject is Cecilia Gallerani, a mistress of Ludovico Sforza ("Il Moro"), Duke of Milan; Leonardo was painter to the Sforza court in Milan at the time of its execution. It is the second of only four surviving portraits of women painted by Leonardo, the others being Ginevra de' Benci, La Belle Ferronnière and the Mona Lisa.

The sitter is depicted at half-length, her body turned toward her right at a three-quarter angle and her face toward her left; the animal in her arms twists in a similar manner. As in many of Leonardo's paintings, the composition forms a pyramidal spiral, reflecting his lifelong preoccupation with the dynamics of movement. The painting was long considered badly damaged and repainted. A 1992 technical analysis at the National Gallery of Art in Washington, D.C. established that the damage was largely confined to the background, which was likely originally bluish-grey and was later overpainted in black. It had always been known that Leonardo painted a portrait of Cecilia Gallerani. However, the Lady with an Ermine remained largely unknown to scholars until nearly the 20th century, and only then was it widely accepted as his work.

Prince Adam Jerzy Czartoryski acquired the painting in Italy in 1798, and it entered the Czartoryski family collections at Puławy in 1800. It travelled widely during the 19th century, including to the family's place of exile at the Hôtel Lambert in Paris, before being brought to Kraków in 1876. The Nazis seized it in 1939, and it hung in the Wawel Castle offices of Hans Frank, Governor-General of occupied Poland. Allied troops recovered it at Frank's country home in Bavaria at the end of the Second World War, and it was returned to Poland in 1946, where it remained on display in Kraków. In 2016 the Princes Czartoryski Foundation, which legally owned the painting, sold it to the Polish government, together with other works from the collection, for €100 million. Lady with an Ermine is on permanent display at the Czartoryski Museum in Kraków, a branch of the National Museum in Kraków, and is considered one of Poland's national treasures.

== Description ==
=== Composition ===
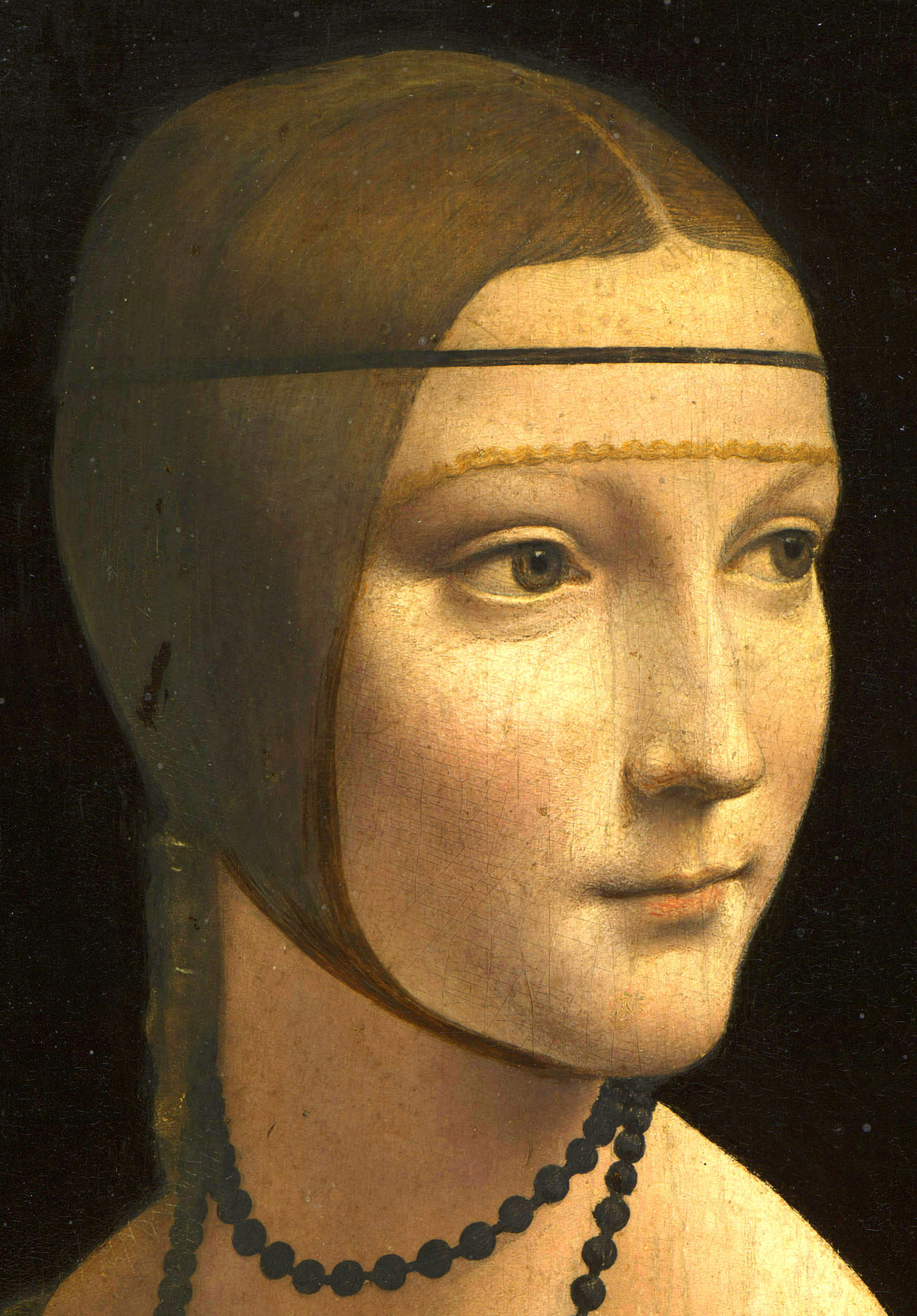
Detail of the lady's head

The painting was executed in oils on a relatively small, 54.8 cm × 40.3 cm (21.6 in × 15.9 in) walnut wood panel. It depicts a half-height woman turned toward her right at a three-quarter angle, but with her face turned toward her left. The animal in her arms twists in a similar manner, resulting in considerable contrapposto with the lady, a technique Leonardo explored earlier with the angel in the Virgin of the Rocks. The work is prepared with a layer of white gesso and a layer of brownish underpaint. In general, the paint is evenly applied akin to the Mona Lisa, though certain areas of the lady's skin are more layered. Also present are the subtle remains of spolvero (in the outline of the face and head), underdrawing (in the right arm, right hand, left hand, top of nose and edge of the hair), and fingerprints (the face and animal's head), the latter of which are particularly common in Leonardo's paintings. It is made from a single piece of walnut wood; Leonardo recommended and favored walnut wood, though it was not commonly used by other artists in Lombardy. The wood is thin (about 4–5 millimetres (0.16–0.20 in)) and is most likely from the same tree as the wood for his later portrait, La Belle Ferronnière. The Lady with an Ermine is also connected to La Belle Ferronnière, as well as Leonardo's earlier Portrait of a Musician, due to the three paintings including black backgrounds.

Though there are a few areas of minor damage, art historian Frank Zöllner insists the work is in "very good condition... similar to the equally well preserved Mona Lisa". Such an evaluation is relatively recent, however, as the work was previously considered to be considerably damaged and repainted. Promotion of such an analysis largely began with the art historian Kenneth Clark, who asserted in 1961 that the entire left side of the figure, as well as the background had been repainted. Scholars such as Adolfo Venturi, Angela Ottino della Chiesa and Jack Wasserman advanced the idea; however, a 1992 technical analysis at the National Gallery of Art led by David Bull has confirmed that the damage was limited to the background. Specifically, the background was likely originally a bluish-grey, overpainted with black during the mid-18th century. The signature LEONARD D'AWINCI in the top left corner was probably also added at this time. There is also slight overpainting in the mouth and nose; some art historians suggest Eugène Delacroix was responsible for the overpaint in the background and elsewhere. The background was also subject to the misconception that it originally included a window. It was proposed by Kazimierz Kwiatkowski, who led 1955 X-ray testing at Warsaw Laboratories, and explained certain spots in the right background as being remnants of a window. (Note: Kwiatkowski himself, however, noted that they "had perhaps been abandoned by the artist himself during the final developmental stage of his work and as a consequence were erased [painted over] [...]".) Such a conclusion has been disproven by Bull, Pietro C. Marani and others. In light of this revision—with the primary damage being overpaint in the background—the art historian Martin Kemp noted that "the picture is in much better condition than the standard accounts suggest, and gives the clearest indication of the freshly brilliant quality of Leonardo's painting during his period at the Sforza court in Milan".

=== The Lady ===
The subject has been identified with reasonable certainty as Cecilia Gallerani, the mistress of Leonardo's Milanese employer, Ludovico Sforza. She looks to her left at something out of frame, toward the light, where the biographer Walter Isaacson suggests Ludovico is. Following the marriage of Isabella of Aragon, Duchess of Milan and Gian Galeazzo Sforza, her 'Spanish style' dress would have been particularly fashionable. She has a silk sbernia on over her left shoulder, though Leonardo has simplified the traditional manner of wearing—where it would be draped over both shoulders—potentially to avoid too much complication in the various elements of the painting. Her right shoulder shows an ornately embroidered gold band over a velvet dress. Again, Leonardo has simplified the design, by having the left shoulder band covered by the sbernia, so as to not take away from the animal's detailed head. Her coiffure, known as a coazzone, confines her hair smoothly to her head with two bands of it bound on either side of her face and a long plait at the back. Her hair is held in place by a fine gauze veil with a woven border of gold-wound threads, a black band, and a sheath over the plait.

As in many of Leonardo's paintings, the composition comprises a pyramidic spiral and the sitter is caught in the motion of turning to her left, reflecting Leonardo's lifelong preoccupation with the dynamics of movement. The three-quarter profile portrait was one of his many innovations. Il Moro's court poet, Bernardo Bellincioni, was the first to propose that Cecilia was poised as if listening to an unseen speaker. This work in particular shows Leonardo's expertise in painting the human form. The artist painted Cecilia's outstretched hand with a lot of detail, including the shape of each fingernail, the lines around her knuckles, and even the way the tendon in her bent finger moved as it bent.

A recent study brings to the forefront and supports another so far little-followed hypothesis: the heroic character of Caterina Sforza, the lioness of Romagna, is proposed as being the model of this allegorical representation in which the mental strength and beauty that were attributed to Amazons in mythology.

=== The ermine ===
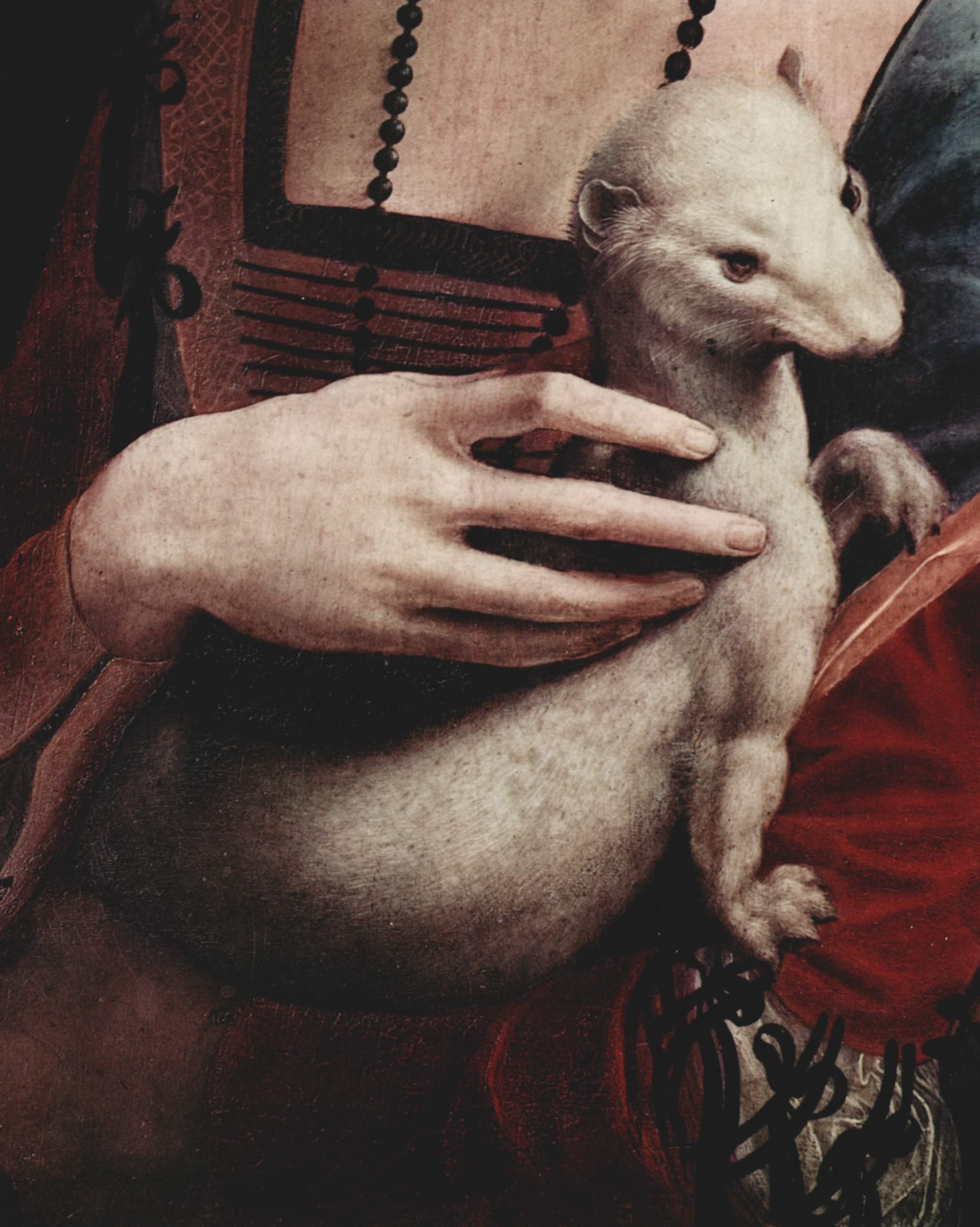
Detail of the ermine

The animal resting in Cecilia's arms is usually known as an ermine but appears to be an albino ferret. Commentators have noted that it is too large to be an ermine, but its size is explained by its being of a largely symbolic nature. The art historian Luke Syson notes that "Naturalism is not the point here; Leonardo has created a mythical beast, the composite of several animals he drew at this time". There are several interpretations of the ermine's significance and they are often used in combination with each other. In its winter coat, the ermine was a traditional symbol of purity and moderation, as it was believed it would face death rather than soil its white coat.

In his old age, Leonardo compiled a bestiary in which he recorded: "The ermine out of moderation never eats but once a day, and it would rather let itself be captured by hunters than take refuge in a dirty lair, in order not to stain its purity." He repeats this idea in another note, "Moderation curbs all the vices. The ermine prefers to die rather than soil itself." A drawing by Leonardo in pen and ink of c. 1490, housed at the Fitzwilliam Museum in Cambridge, depicts an ermine representing these ideals by surrendering to a hunter. The ermine has also been noted to have a personal significance to Ludovico Sforza, as he would use it as a personal emblem, having been appointed by Ferdinand I as a member of the Order of the Ermine in 1488. Alternatively, the ermine could be a pun on Cecilia's surname: The Ancient Greek term for ermine, or other weasel-like species of animals, is galê (γαλῆ) or galéē (γαλέη). Such allusions were particularly popular in Renaissance culture; Leonardo himself had done something similar in his earlier work, Ginevra de' Benci, when he surrounded Ginevra with a juniper tree, or ginepro in Italian. Krystyna Moczulska suggests that the ermine follows the meaning of an ermine or weasel in classical literature, where it relates to pregnancy, sometimes as an animal that protected pregnant women. Around the time of the painting's creation, Cecilia was known to be pregnant with Ludovico's illegitimate son.

The ermine can also be understood in the context of Cecilia's marriage to Count Lodovico Bergamino, which took place soon after the birth of her son by Ludovico in 1491. The ermine was a common motif in representations of chastity in Renaissance Italy, popularized by its appearance as an attribute of Chastity in Petrarch's poem I Trionfi. Petrarch's poem, which describes Chasity as triumphing over Love, was often depicted in lavishly decorated chests (called cassone) which formed an important part of the wedding trousseau of brides from prominent backgrounds. In such a context, the ermine, as a symbol of chastity, also symbolizes marital fidelity. The presence of the ermine thus points both to Cecilia's connection with Ludovico as well as her upcoming marriage to Bergamino.

== Attribution ==
It was not until the 20th century that the Lady with an Ermine was widely accepted by scholars to be a work of Leonardo. The attribution is due to the style of chiaroscuro, intricate detail and "contemplative tone" typical of Leonardo.

== Dating ==
The Lady with an Ermine can securely be dated to Leonardo's first Milanese period (c. 1482–1499). Specifically, scholars date the painting to 1489–1491. (Note: Scholars date the painting to c. 1489–1491: Kemp (2019): c. 1491; Marani (2003, p. 339): 1489–1490; Syson et al. (2011, p. 111): c. 1489–1490; Zöllner (2019, p. 226): 1489/1490)

== Background ==
=== Historical context ===
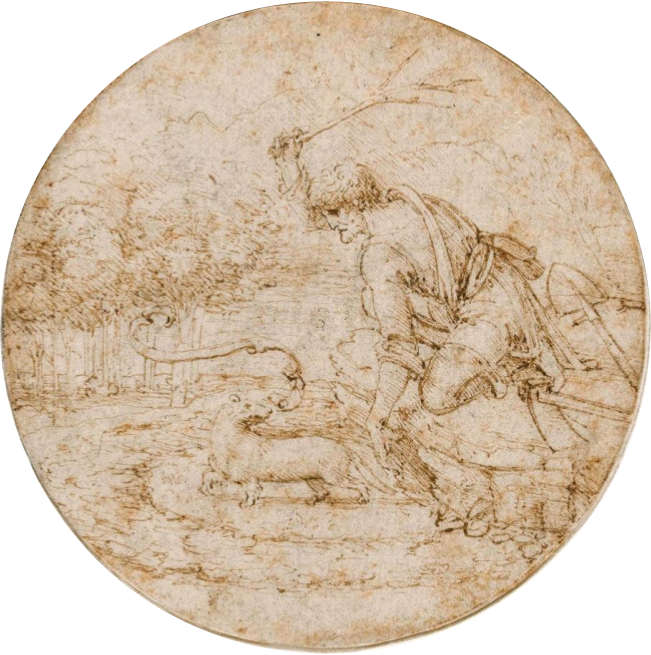
The Ermine Hunt (c. 1490), a pen and ink drawing by Leonardo da Vinci

To some extent the painting includes traditional characteristics of Italian portraiture from the 1430s and 1440s; the coloring, for example, is particularly reminiscent of the Florentine quattrocento tradition.

=== Commission ===
The sitter has been identified with reasonable certainty as Cecilia Gallerani, the mistress of Leonardo's employer, Ludovico Sforza. (Note: Martin Kemp states "the identification of the sitter in this painting as Cecilia Gallerani is reasonably secure." Janice Shell and Grazioso Sironi discuss the career of this identification since it was first suggested in 1900.)

Gallerani was a member of a large family that was neither wealthy nor noble. Her father served for a time at the Duke's court. At the time of the portrait, she was about sixteen years old and was renowned for her beauty, scholarship and poetry. She was married at approximately age six to a young nobleman of the house of Visconti, but sued to annul the marriage in 1487 for undisclosed reasons and the request was granted. She became the Duke's mistress and bore him a son, even after his marriage to Beatrice d'Este eleven years previously. Beatrice was promised to the Duke when she was only five, and married him when she was sixteen in 1491. After a few months, she discovered the Duke was still seeing Gallerani, and forced the Duke to end the relationship by having her married to Count Ludovico Carminati di Brambilla, also known as Il Bergamino. The newly-wed couple was moved to Palazzo Carmagnola in Milan.

=== History ===
It has always been known that Leonardo painted a portrait of Ludovico Sforza's mistress, Cecilia Gallerani, but the Lady with an Ermine remained largely unknown to scholars until nearly the 20th century. The painting was acquired in Italy in 1798 by Prince Adam George Czartoryski, the son of Izabela Czartoryska Flemming and Prince Adam Kazimierz Czartoryski, and incorporated into the Czartoryski family collections at Puławy in 1800. The inscription on the top-left corner of the painting, LA BELE FERONIERE. LEONARD DAWINCI., was probably added by a restorer shortly after its arrival in Poland, and before the background was overpainted. Czartoryski was clearly aware it was a Leonardo, although the painting had never been discussed in print; no record exists of any previous owner. The Belle Ferronière is the Leonardo portrait in the Louvre, whose sitter bears such a close resemblance; the Czartoryskis considered this sitter to be the same.

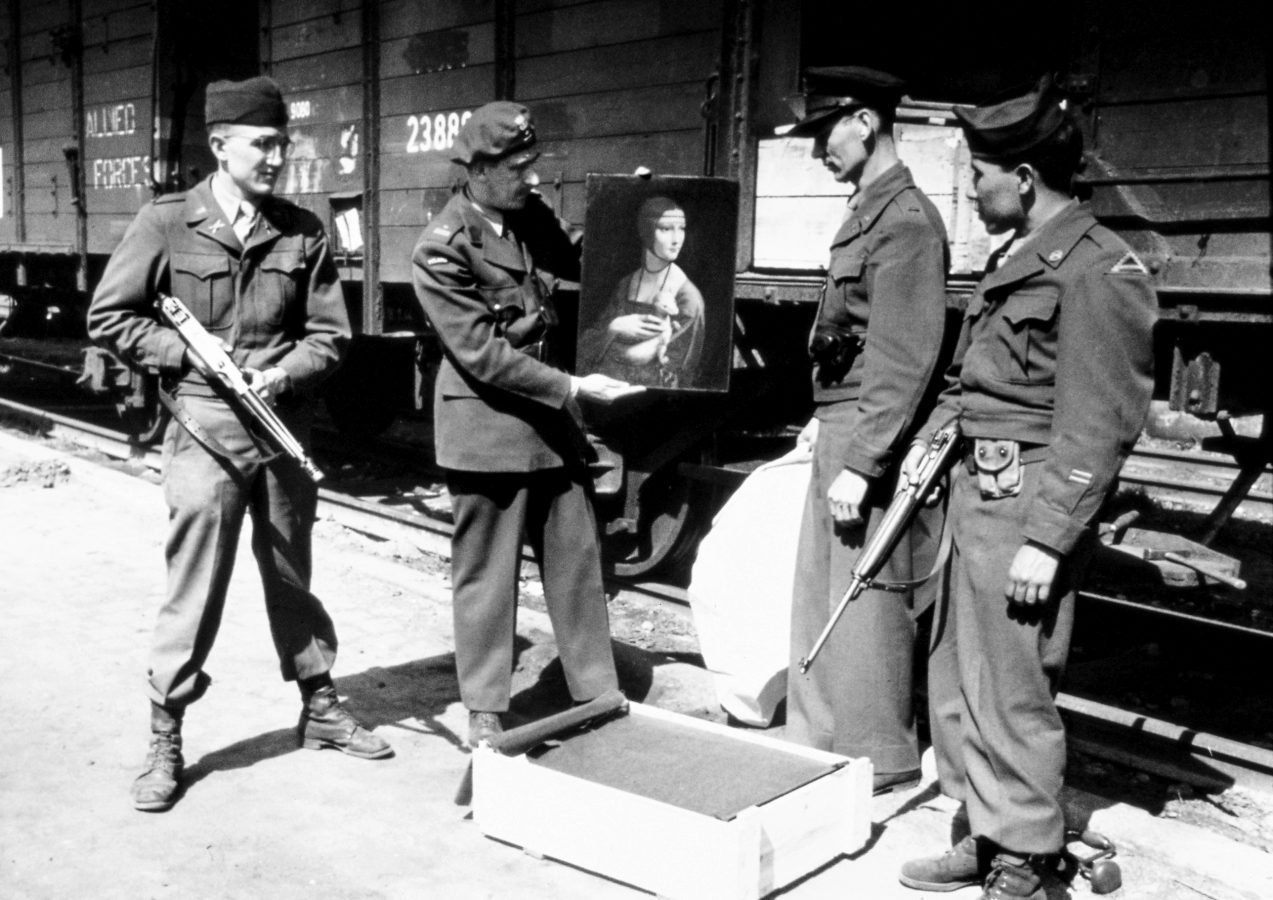
"Monuments Men" – Frank P. Albright, Everett Parker Lesley, Joe D. Espinosa – and Polish liaison officer Karol Estreicher pose with the painting upon its return to Poland in April 1946.

The painting travelled widely during the 19th century. During the November Uprising in 1830, the 84-year-old Princess Czartoryska rescued it in advance of the invading Russian army, hid it, and sent it 150 km south to the Czartoryski palace at Sieniawa. Soon after, it was transferred to the Czartoryski place of exile in Paris, the Hôtel Lambert. The family returned to Poland in 1869, settling in Kraków. In the tumultuous aftermath of the German occupation of Paris in 1871 and the Commune, the family brought the painting to Kraków in 1876 and the museum opened in 1878. During World War I, the painting was moved to the Gemäldegalerie Alte Meister in Dresden for safe-keeping, returning to Kraków in 1920.

In 1939, anticipating the German occupation of Poland, it was again moved to Sieniawa, but it was discovered and seized by the Nazis and sent to the Kaiser Friedrich Museum in Berlin. In 1940, Hans Frank, the Governor General of Poland, saw the painting there and requested it be returned to Kraków, where it hung in his suite of offices in the Wawel Castle. In 1941, it was transferred to a warehouse of other plundered art in Breslau. In 1943 it was brought back to Kraków and exhibited at the Wawel Castle. At the end of the Second World War it was discovered by Allied troops in Frank's country home in Schliersee, Bavaria, and was returned to Poland in 1946. It was again placed on exhibit at the Czartoryski Museum in Kraków. Throughout the mid–late 20th century the work traveled the world more extensively than any other Leonardo painting, being exhibited in Warsaw (1952), Moscow (1972), Washington, D.C. (1991/92), Malmö (1993/94), Rome/Milan (1998), Florence (1999).

On 29 December 2016, Lady with an Ermine and other works of art from the Princes Czartoryski Collection was sold for €100 million (5% of the estimated market value of the entire collection) to the Polish government by the Princes Czartoryski Foundation, represented by Adam Karol Czartoryski, the last direct descendant of Izabela Czartoryska Flemming and Adam George Czartoryski. The painting remained displayed at the Czartoryski Museum until it closed for renovations in 2010. From May 2017 to 2019, it was exhibited in the National Museum in Kraków, just outside the Old Town. It returned to the Czartoryski Museum for the museum's reopening on 19 December 2019.

== See also ==
- List of works by Leonardo da Vinci

== Sources ==
Books

- Beard, Lee (2018). 30-Second Great Art; From Masaccio to Matisse, 50 Artworks That Changed the Way We See Things. Ivy Press. ISBN 9781782405528.
- Clark, Kenneth (1961). Leonardo da Vinci. Harmondsworth: Penguin Books. OCLC 187223.
- Ottino della Chiesa, Angela (1967). The Complete Paintings of Leonardo da Vinci. Penguin Classics of World Art. London: Penguin Books. ISBN 978-0-14-008649-2.
- Constantino, Maria (2001). Leonardo. PRC. ISBN 9781856486163.
- Isaacson, Walter (2017). Leonardo da Vinci. New York: Simon & Schuster. ISBN 978-1-5011-3915-4.
- Kemp, Martin (2019). Leonardo da Vinci: The 100 Milestones. New York: Sterling. ISBN 978-1-4549-304-26.
- Marani, Pietro C. (2003) [2000]. Leonardo da Vinci: The Complete Paintings. New York: Harry N. Abrams. ISBN 978-0-8109-3581-5.
- Palmer, Allison Lee (2018). Leonardo da Vinci: A Reference Guide to His Life and Works (Significant Figures in World History). Lanham: Rowman & Littlefield. ISBN 978-1-5381-1977-8.
- Pedretti, Carlo (1982). Leonardo, a study in chronology and style. Cambridge: Johnson Reprint Corp. ISBN 978-0-3844-5281-7.
- Pedretti, Carlo (2006). Leonardo da Vinci. Surrey: Taj Books International. ISBN 978-1-8440-6036-8.
- Syson, Luke; Keith, Larry; Galansino, Arturo; Mazzotta, Antoni; Nethersole, Scott; Rumberg, Per (2011). Leonardo da Vinci: Painter at the Court of Milan. London: National Gallery. ISBN 978-1-85709-491-6.
- Vezzosi, Alessandro (1997). Leonardo da Vinci: Renaissance Man. New Horizons. Translated by Bonfante-Warren, Alexandra (English translation ed.). London: Thames & Hudson. ISBN 978-0-500-30081-7.
- Wasserman, Jack (1975). Leonardo da Vinci. New York: Harry N. Abrams. ISBN 978-0-8109-0262-6.
- Zöllner, Frank (2015). Leonardo (2nd ed.). Cologne: Taschen. ISBN 978-3-8365-0215-3.
- Zöllner, Frank (2019) [2003]. Leonardo da Vinci: The Complete Paintings and Drawings (Anniversary ed.). Cologne: Taschen. ISBN 978-3-8365-7625-3.

Journals and articles

- Beck, James (1993). "The Dream of Leonardo da Vinci". Artibus et Historiae. 14 (27): 185–198. doi:10.2307/1483451. JSTOR 1483451.
- Brown, David Alan (1983). "Leonardo and the Idealized Portrait in Milan". Arte Lombarda. 64 (4): 102–116. JSTOR 43105426.
- Bull, David (1992). "Two Portraits by Leonardo: "Ginevra de' Benci" and the "Lady with an Ermine"". Artibus et Historiae. 13 (25): 67–83. doi:10.2307/1483457. JSTOR 1483457.
- Kemp, Martin (February 1985). "Leonardo da Vinci: Science and the Poetic Impulse". Journal of the Royal Society of Arts. 133 (5343): 196–214. JSTOR 41373924.
- Kemp, Martin (2003). "Leonardo da Vinci". Grove Art Online. Oxford: Oxford University Press. doi:10.1093/gao/9781884446054.article.T050401. ISBN 9781884446054. (subscription, Wikipedia Library access or UK public library membership required)
- Shell, Janice; Sironi, Grazioso (1992). "Cecilia Gallerani: Leonardo's Lady with an Ermine". Artibus et Historiae. 13 (25): 47–66. doi:10.2307/1483456. JSTOR 1483456.

Online

- Bull, David (1992a). "Leonardo: Lady with an Ermine: Preservation and scientific examinations". Art Galleries. Archived from the original on 1 October 2018.
- Muchnic, Suzanne (1 April 2003). "An intriguing tale of survival". Los Angeles Times. Los Angeles. Archived from the original on 30 March 2019.
- Stanford, Peter (12 November 2011). "Will The Lady with an Ermine topple the Mona Lisa as the world's favourite painting?". London: The Telegraph.
- Wallace, Marina; Kemp, Martin. "Portrait of Cecilia Gallerani (The Lady with the Ermine)". London: University of the Arts, London. Archived from the original on 15 October 2006.
