= Tête d'enfant de trois quarts à droite =

Drawing by Leonardo da Vinci

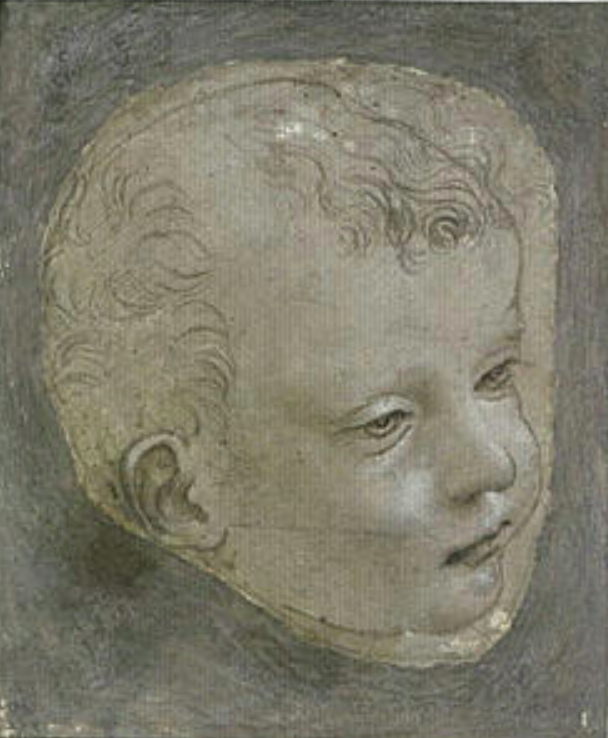
- Artist: Leonardo Da Vinci
- Year: Circa 1483
- Medium: Metal point enhanced with white, ink with pen and brush on pasted paper Wash, highlight, pen-and-ink drawing
- Dimensions: 13.4 cm × 11.9 cm (5.3 in × 4.7 in)
- Location: Louvre, Paris
- Accession: INV 2347, recto

The Tête d'enfant de trois quarts à droite is a silverpoint drawing on paper by the Florentine painter Leonardo da Vinci. It belongs to the Codex Vallardi and is preserved at the Department of Graphic Arts of the Louvre Museum in Paris.

This small-sized drawing portrays the head of a very young child. This is a preparatory study for the head of the infant John the Baptist in the Louvre Museum version of The Virgin of the Rocks, which was commissioned by the Brotherhood of the Immaculate Conception. It was likely created around 1483 and is one of the last three known studies related to this painting.

The drawing is characterized by melancholy and introspection, and it falls within the artist's favored theme of depicting babies. This drawing exhibits all of Leonardo da Vinci's qualities as a draftsman. Although it underwent retouching, which may have raised questions about its authenticity, it remains an excellent example of his work.

== Description ==
The drawing of the Tête d'enfant de trois quarts à droite is on a paper sheet prepared with gray-beige. This sheet is irregularly cut and then pasted onto another, thicker paper sheet prepared with gray-brown. The ovoid-shaped drawing support measures 13.4 × 11.9 cm, while the sheet onto which it is glued measures 16.9 × 14.0 cm. The drawing was made using a metal tip enhanced with white, and it has been revised with ink using a quill and brush. The drawing depicts the head of a very young child, with prick marks around the contours of the eyes, nose, ear, and the top of the skull. On the back of the sheet, there are traces and annotations made with quill and brown ink.

There is a line under the middle of the chin marking a fragment of the left shoulder, but no indication of the rest of the body. Additionally, the position of the head implies a clockwise rotation. Furthermore, the light source appears to be coming from the right side of the viewer, as evidenced by the bright highlights on the child's forehead and cheeks.

== History ==
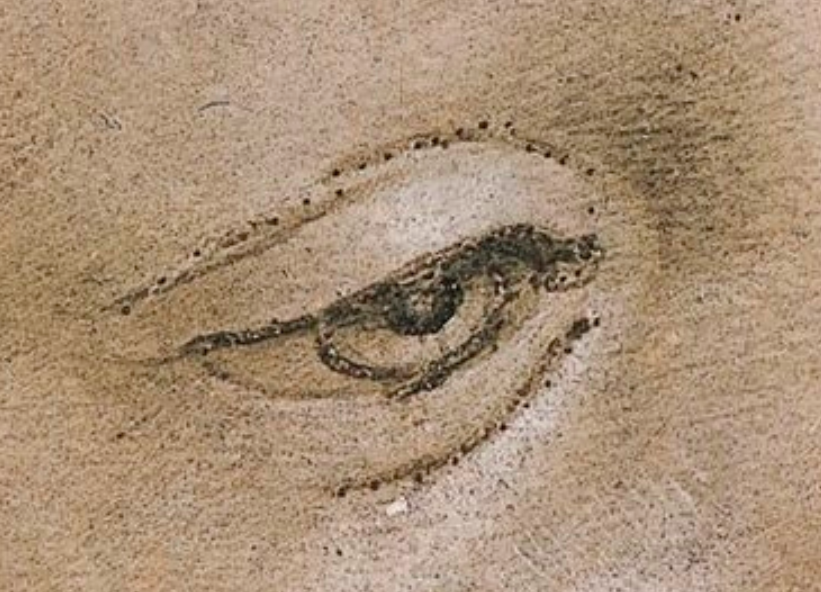
Detail: traces of stitching are visible on the contours of the eyelids. They indicate that the drawing was transferred to another support.

=== Creation background ===
Leonardo da Vinci created the Tête d'enfant de trois quarts à droite when he was thirty years old and had recently moved to Milan from the Florentine workshop of Verrocchio. Despite being a recognized artist, he lacked the connections to receive enough commissions to live off his art in Milan. Meeting Giovanni Ambrogio de Predis, a well-known painter at the court of Ludovico Sforza, also known as the Moor, was very beneficial. De Predis helped the author become known to the local aristocracy. Thus, the artist was commissioned to decorate the Immaculate Conception altarpiece, which was the centerpiece of a newly built chapel between 1475 and 1480 in the Church of San Francesco Maggiore in Milan. Three artists were involved in gilding the woodwork and sculpted parts, as well as painting the panels. Leonardo da Vinci was commissioned to create the central panel, which would later be titled The Virgin of the Rocks. The drawing is possibly a fragment of the original cartoon and is part of this creation.

=== Attribution and date ===
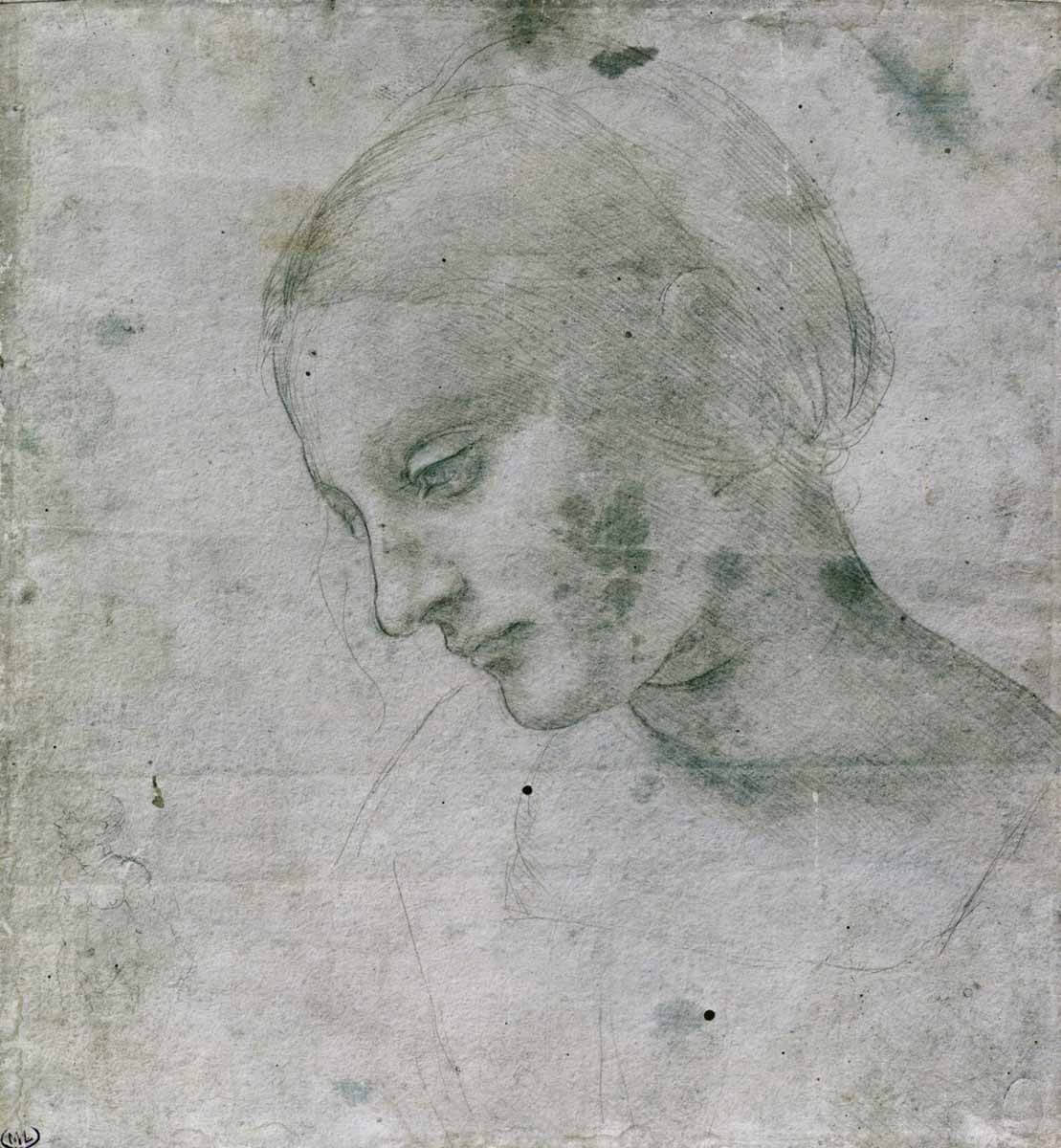
The Tête d'enfant de trois-quarts à droite is attributed to Leonardo da Vinci on the basis of technical and stylistic comparisons with this Tête de femme presque de profil (Head of a woman, almost in profile ), which dates from the early 1490s (Paris, Département des arts graphiques du musée du Louvre, INV 2376, Recto).

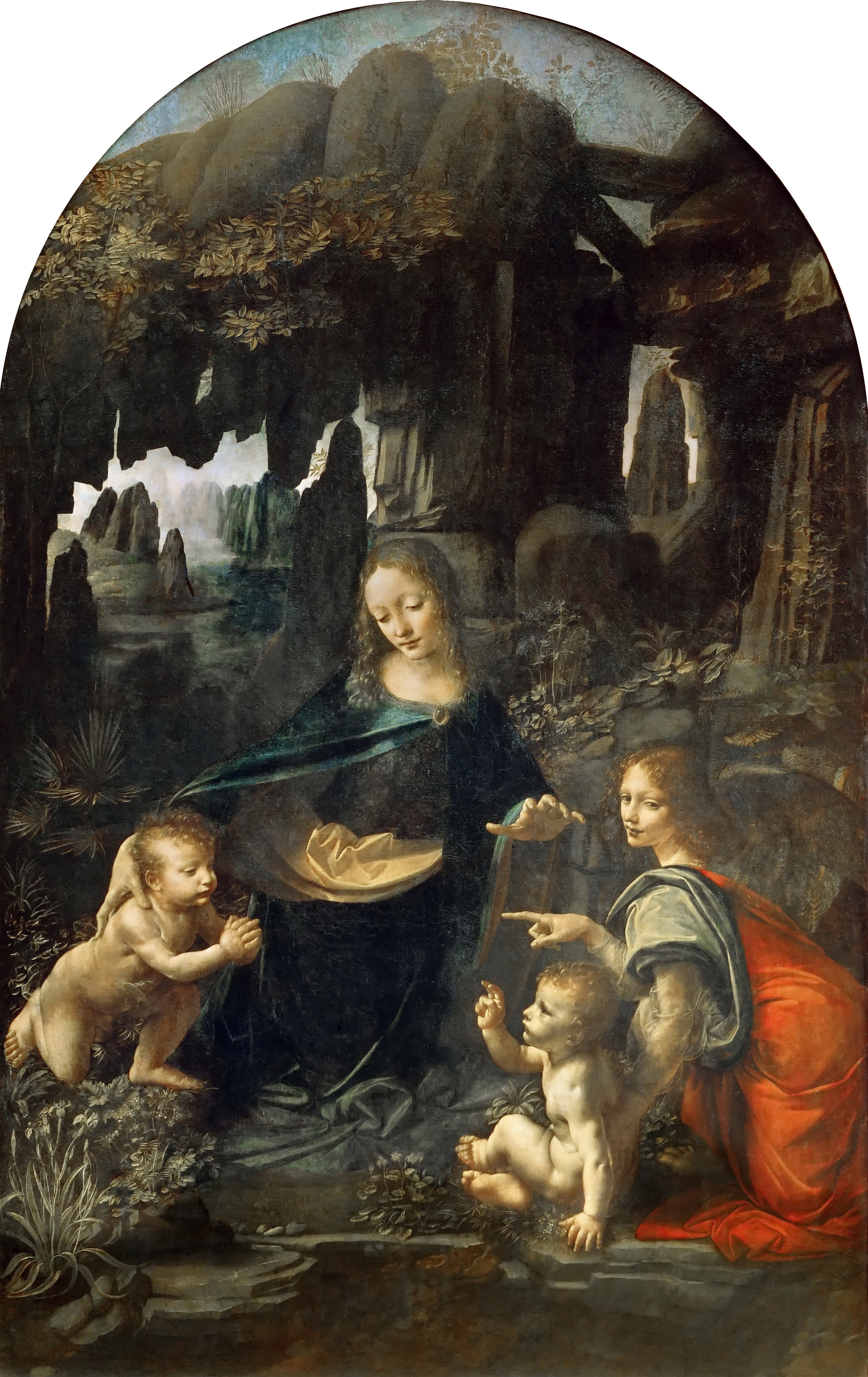
The Virgin of the Rocks (1483–1486, Paris, Musée du Louvre, inv.777). The baby's face on the left, identified with Saint John the Baptist, is modeled on the Tête d'enfant de trois quarts à droite.

Art historians have long believed that the drawing originated from the circle of Leonardo da Vinci, including students or workshop members such as Ambrogio de Predis or Giovanni Antonio Boltraffio. This is due to the presence of certain technical treatments that are clearly not by the master's hand, such as the white highlights and ink revisions.

However, it seems that these treatments were added after the creation of the work, as indicated by the presence of underlying drawings in these areas. The Tête d'enfant de trois quarts à droite may have served as a pedagogical support, as was common in the master's workshop. Thus, Leonardo is now universally recognized as the author of the artwork. The technical mastery displayed, such as the rendering of shadows on the cheek and temple, along with comparisons to other drawings of the painter, such as the Head of a Woman in Profile, a study dating from the early 1490s for the painting of the Madonna Litta, provide strong evidence for this attribution. Art historian Françoise Viatte summarizes this new state of research as follows: "According to all researchers, this face is the creation of Leonardo and no one else".

The technique used by the master places it within the Florentine period of his production. It is confirmed that the drawing is a study or even a cartoon for the face of the child John the Baptist in the Louvre's version of The Virgin of the Rocks, to which it almost perfectly superimposes. These elements allow it to be dated around 1483.

=== Journey of the work ===
The drawing was acquired by the Louvre Museum in 1856 as part of a codex that bears the name of Giuseppe Vallardi (1784–1861), a print and antiquities dealer who had previously owned it. The codex is a collection of drawings by various Renaissance artists. Since then, it has been preserved in the Department of Graphic Arts at the Louvre Museum in Paris.

== Creation ==
The Tête d'enfant de trois quarts à droite drawing was likely created as a preparatory cartoon for the Louvre version of the Virgin of the Rocks. The head almost perfectly aligns with that of the little Saint John the Baptist, except for the eyelids. The cartoon also features numerous prick marks along the head's contour, indicating a transfer to another support. However, this hypothesis remains uncertain as the transfer by pricks may have occurred after the creation of The Virgin of the Rocks, and therefore, it may not have been executed by Leonardo da Vinci himself, but by one of his students on their own production. Art historian Carlo Pedretti once suggested that the drawing was a study for a Madonna of the Cat, but later agreed with his colleagues' opinion.

The work's life did not end with its creation. It underwent several retouches, including the addition of white highlights on the ear, lower part of the chin, and cheek, as well as the reworking of certain features. However, the study indicates that a right-handed artist carried out the latter changes, making it impossible for Leonardo, who was left-handed, to have made them.

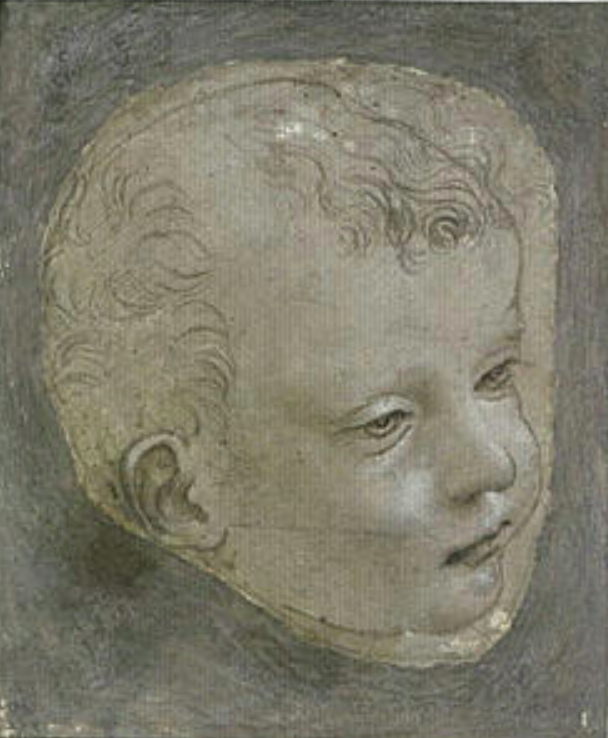
Study for the head of a baby John the Baptist.

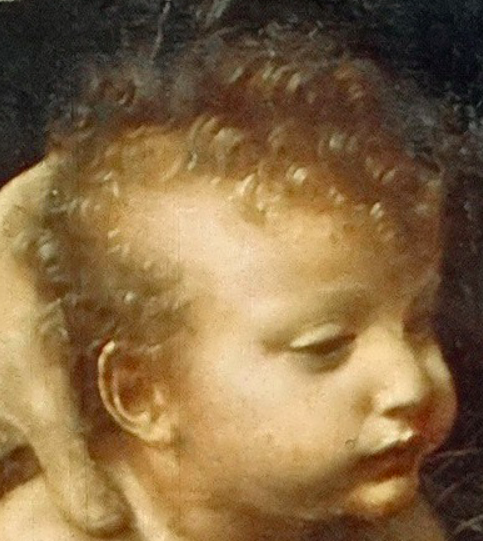
Its implementation in the Louvre version of the Virgin of the Rocks (detail).

Only three studies for the Louvre version of the Virgin of the Rocks have survived. These include a young woman's head, a drawing considered to be a preparatory study for the head of the archangel Uriel (preserved in the Royal Library of Turin), and another presumed by Leonardo for the angel's hand pointing to the infant John the Baptist (preserved in the Royal Library of Windsor Castle). Tête d'enfant de trois quarts à droite is located on the right.

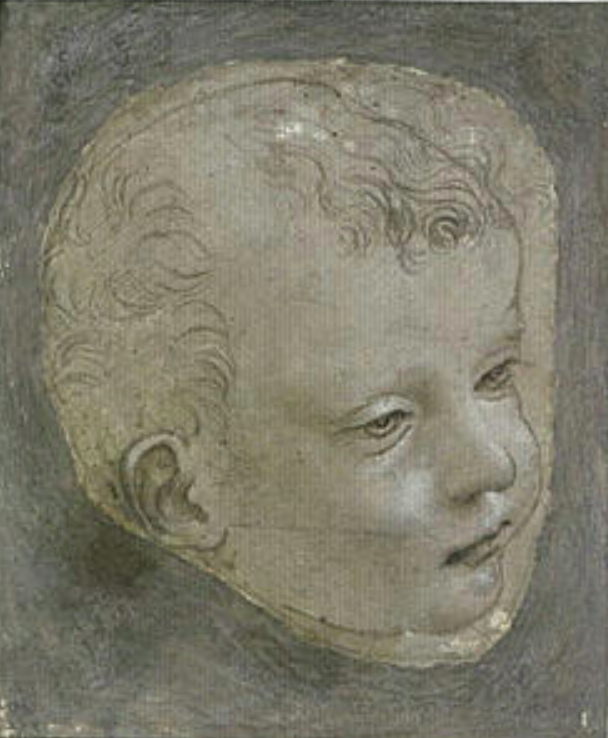
Child's head, three-quarters right (circa 1483, Paris, Louvre, department of graphic arts, inv. 2347).

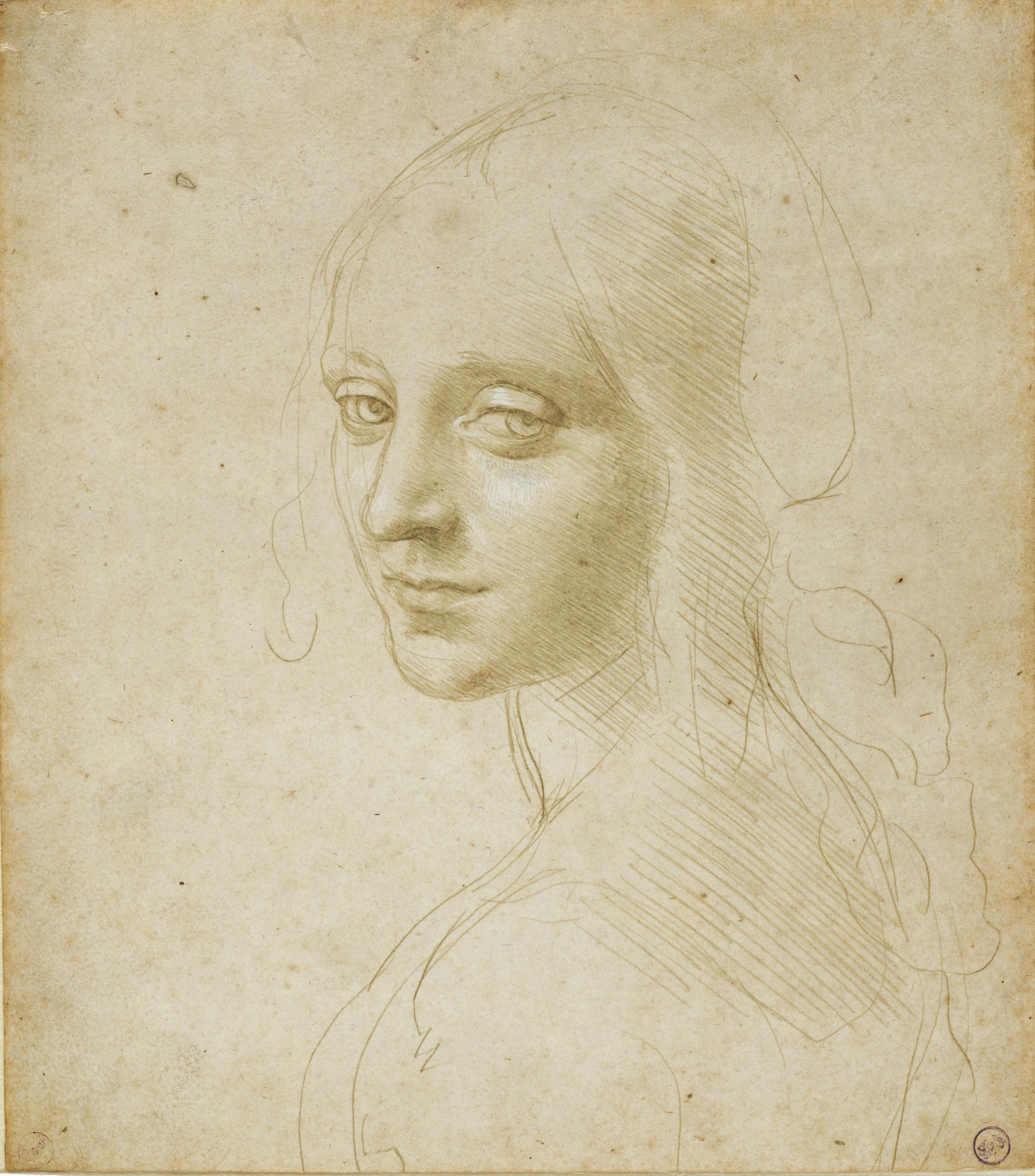
Study for the head of the angel Uriel (circa 1483, Turin, Royal Library, inv. 15572 DC).

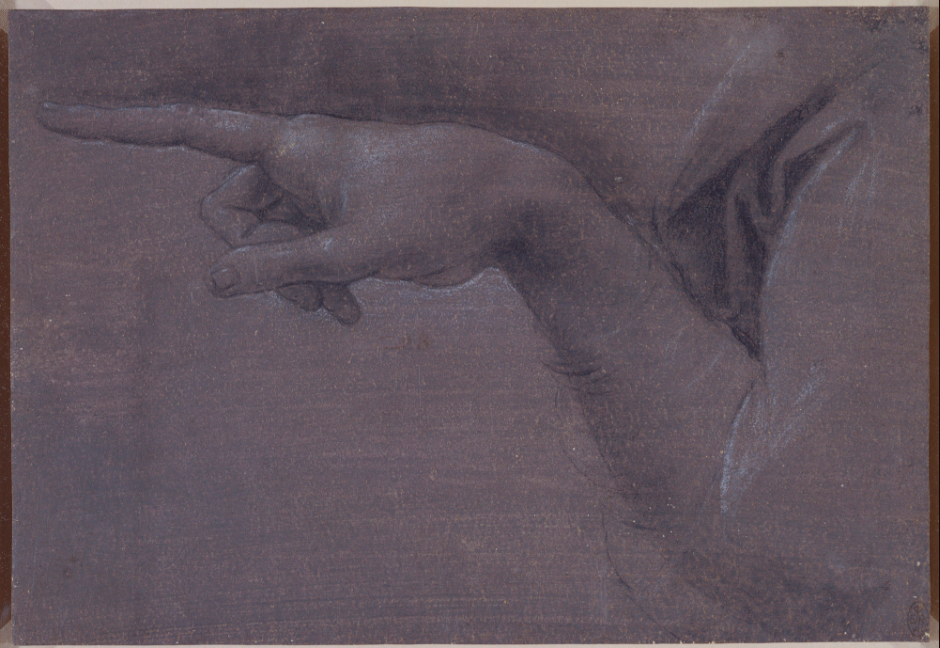
Study for the Hand of the Angel (presumed drawing by Leonardo da Vinci, circa 1483 or 1517-1520, Windsor Castle, Royal Library, inv. RCIN 912520).

== Analysis ==
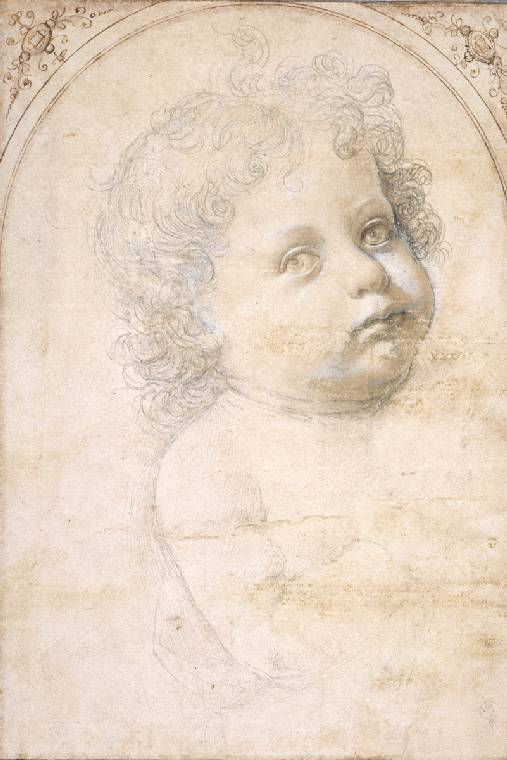
Leonardo da Vinci's master, Verrocchio, certainly passed on to him a taste for depicting children (Andrea del Verrocchio, c. 1480, Child's head and shoulders facing right, Cambridge, Fitzwilliam Museum, inv. no. 2930).

=== Leonardo and the depiction of children ===
Leonardo created the drawing for Tête d'enfant de trois quarts à droite (in Englishː Child's head, three-quarters right) around 1483. He was already practicing child portraiture and had learned the basic schemes from his master Verrocchio. Throughout his life, drawing babies remained one of Leonardo's favorite themes, from his early days in Florence to the end of his life in France. He demonstrated real virtuosity in depicting them, as evidenced by the various studies he produced throughout his career. The drawings were created within the secular framework of mythology, such as the representation of the winds. However, they were more commonly produced within the theme of the Madonna and Child, including the Nativity and Adoration of the Magi, as well as featuring Jesus and Saint John the Baptist, such as in the Virgin of the Rocks and the Saint Anne group. In cases where the child's head is turned three-quarters to the right, the two figures often form an independent group, which the artist preferred to depict.

Examples of drawings by Leonardo da Vinci on the theme of the child: secular subject, Virgin and Child and Jesus and John the Baptist.

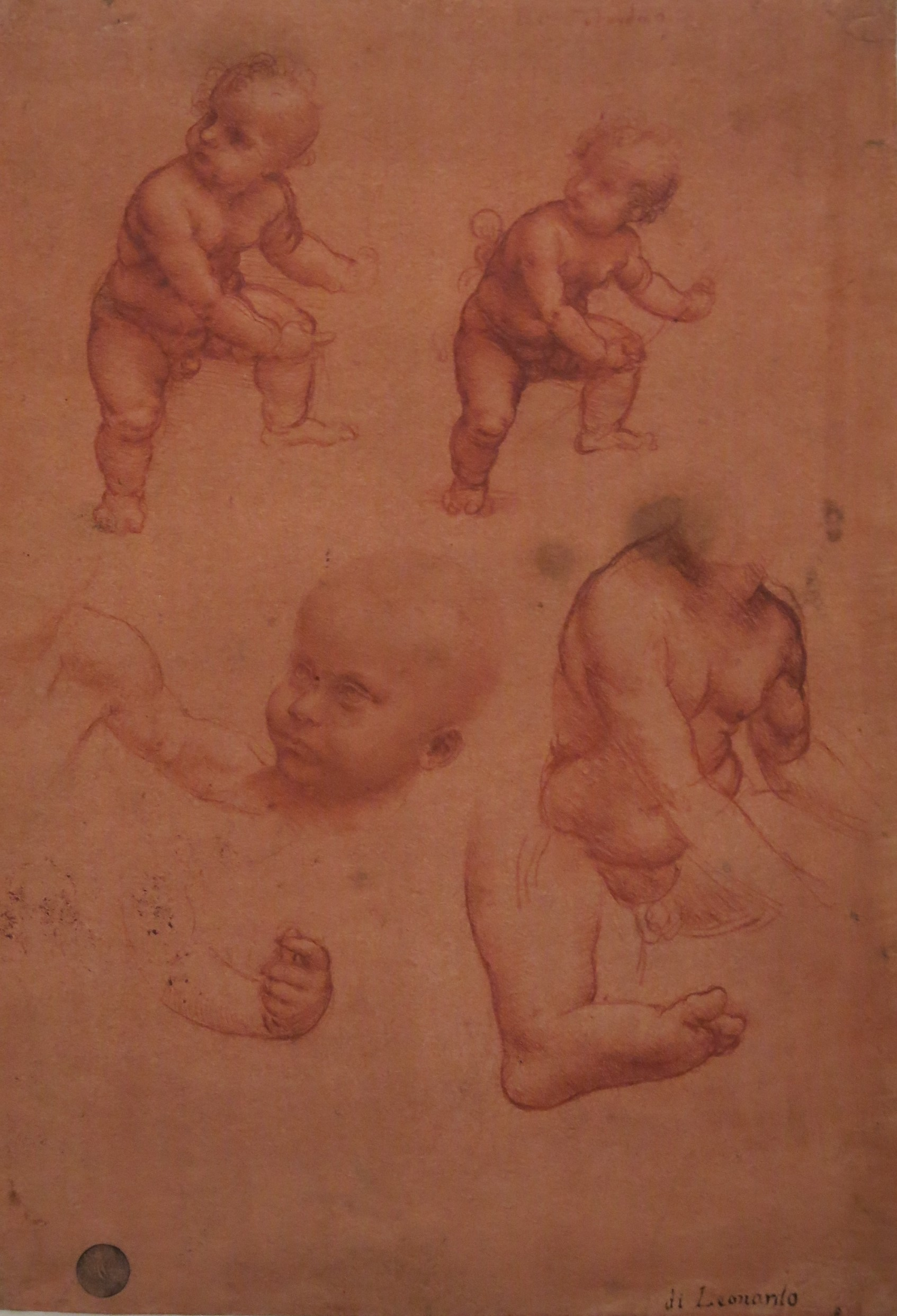
Étude pour l'enfant Jésus, circa 1501-1510, Venice, Gallerie dell'Accademia, inv.257.

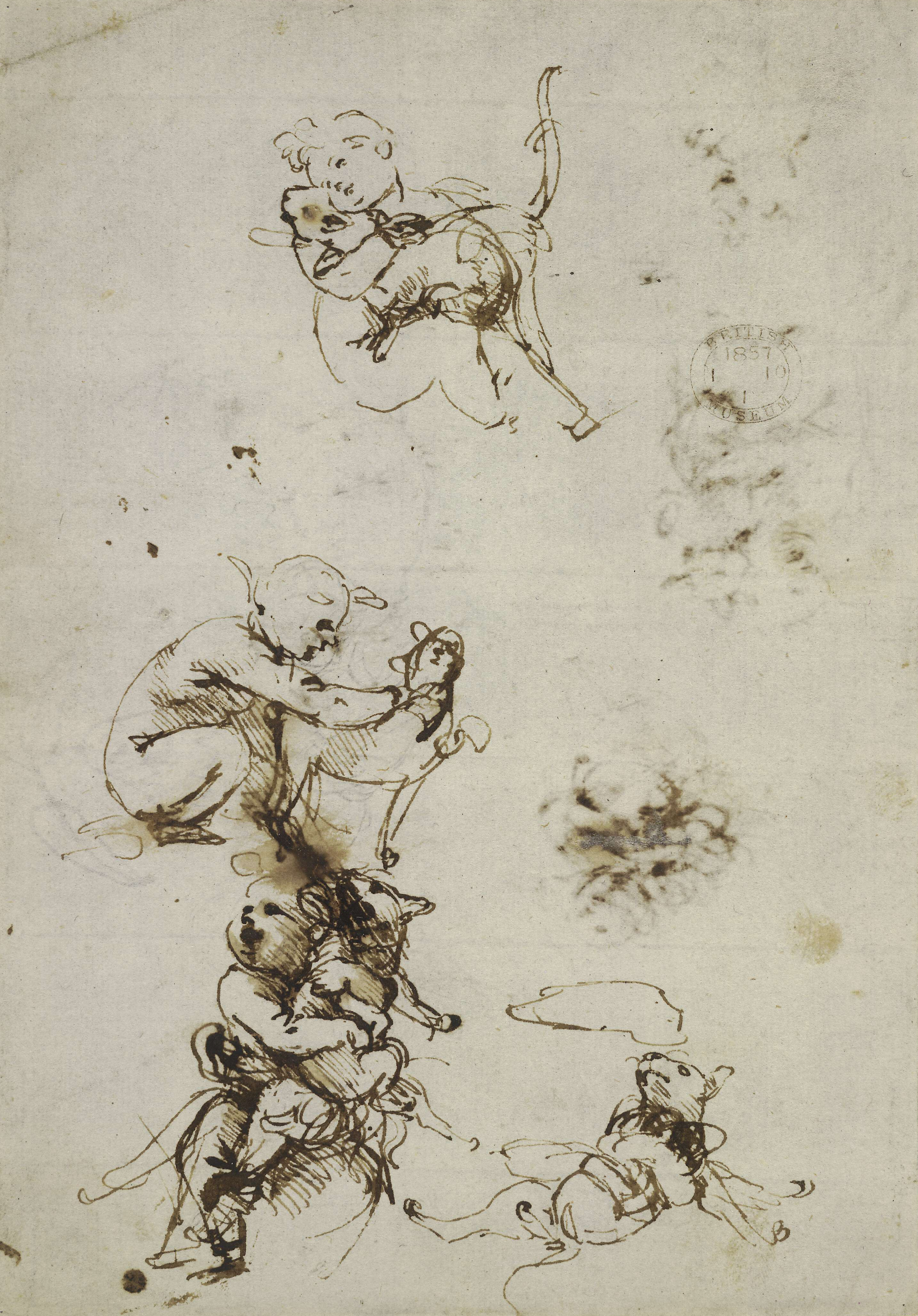
Études d'enfant jouant avec un chat, circa 1478, London, British Museum, inv.1857,0110.1 - recto.

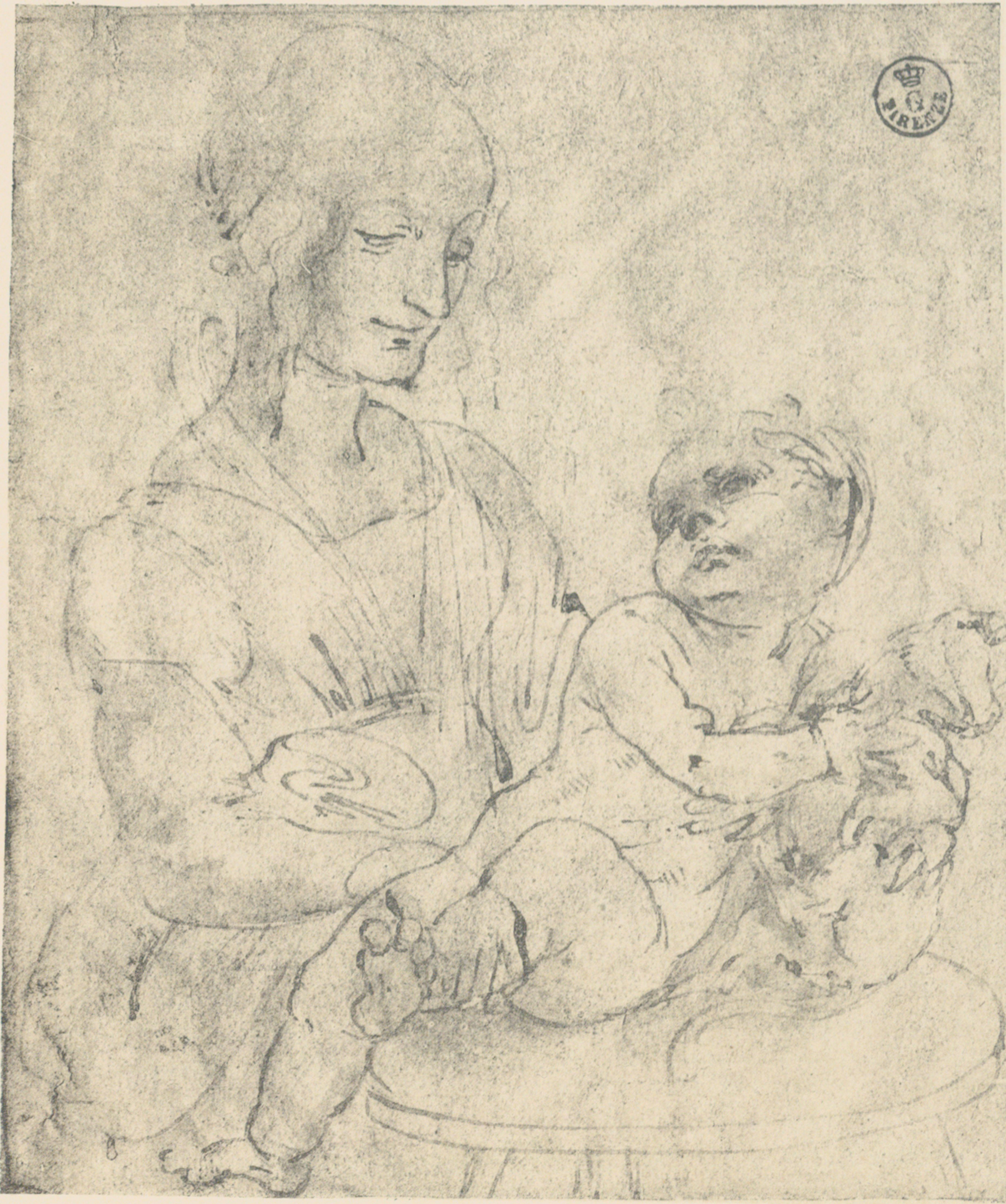
Vierge à l'Enfant caressant un chaton, circa 1480, Florence, Uffizi Gallery, inv.421 E r.

=== A melancholic work ===
The drawing is often described as conveying a sense of melancholy. The child's expression is introspective, with a pensive gaze. This may reflect the mystery of the encounter between Saint John the Baptist and Jesus, as depicted in the Virgin of the Rocks.

== Posterity ==
Leonardo da Vinci is renowned for reusing his research from one work to the next. Scientific imaging reveals that he reused the drawing of the child's head in three-quarter view on the right in the underlying drawing of the London version of the Virgin of the Rocks. This version presents a project for which the painter made initial sketches before covering them for the creation of his Virgin. The child in the sketches is identified by researchers as Jesus, with his features superimposed on him in mirror image.

Likewise, Boltraffio, a renowned painter who borrowed certain motifs from Leonardo, used the drawing. In his painting, Madonna and Child, the face of the infant Jesus is a clear reuse of the Child's Head drawing. It is unlikely that Boltraffio used the drawing in the Louvre, but rather a transferred copy of it.

This face is also present in a lunette frescoed in the cloister of the convent of the Church of Sant'Onofrio on the Janiculum (Italian: Chiesa di Sant'Onofrio al Gianicolo), in Rome. The fresco depicts a Madonna and Child with a donor, painted by Cesare da Sesto, another disciple of the Florentine master.

The drawing has been featured in numerous exhibitions in tribute to the painter, including one at the National Gallery in London from November 2011 to February 2012. The exhibition catalog 'Leonardo da Vinci: Painter at the Court of Milan', edited by Luke Syson and Larry Keith, was published on this occasion.

Leonardo da Vinci's drawing served as a working basis for many of his followers.

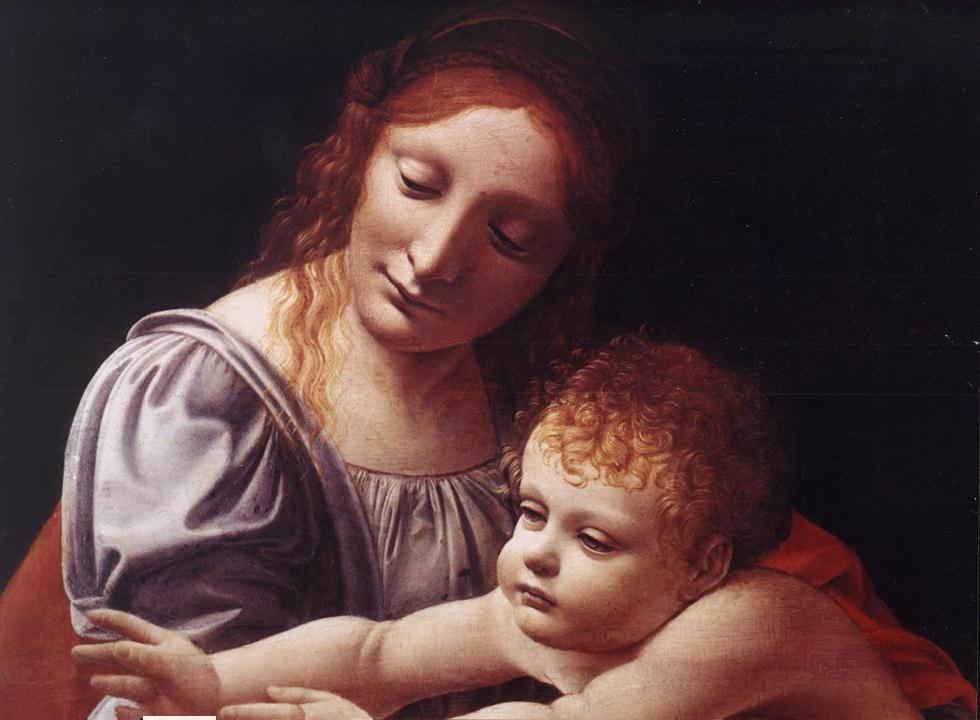
Giovanni Antonio Boltraffio, Madonna and Child (detail), circa 1490, Budapest, Museum of Fine Arts.

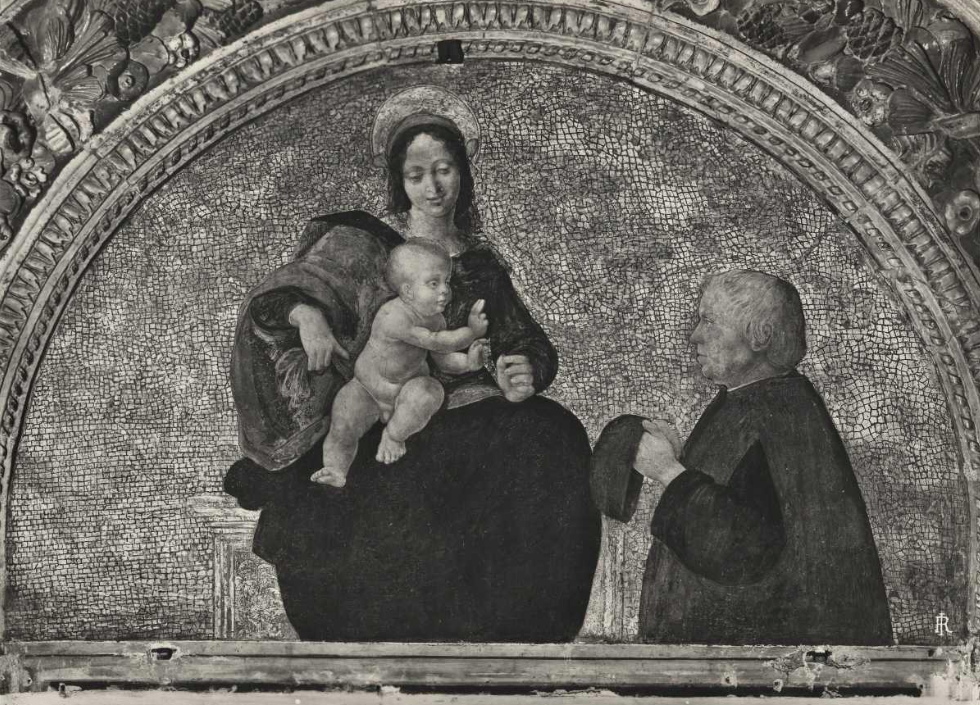
Cesare da Sesto, Vierge à l'enfant avec donateur, 1505 to 1515, Rome, Sant'Onofrio convent on the Janiculum.

== Appendix ==
=== Bibliography ===
==== Books ====
- Blatt, Katy (2018). Leonardo da Vinci and The Virgin of the Rocks: one painter, two virgins, twenty-five years [Léonard de Vinci et la Vierge aux rochers: un peintre, deux vierges, vingt cinq ans]. Vol. XVII-180. Newcastle: Cambridge Scholars Publishing. ISBN 978-1-5275-0644-2. OCLC 1019751278.
- Marani, Pietro C. (2003). Leonardo's drawings in Milan and their influence on the graphic works of the milanese artists. Vol. xiv-786. New York: Metropolitan Museum of Art; Yale University Press. pp. 155–190. ISBN 978-1-5883-9034-9.
- Nathan, Johannes; Zöllner, Frank (6 November 2014). Léonard de Vinci, 1452-1519: l'œuvre graphique (in French). Translated by Fruhtrunk, Wolf. Köln: Taschen. pp. 155–190. ISBN 978-3-8365-5440-4.
- Pedretti, Carlo; Taglialagamba, Sara (2017). Léonard de Vinci: L'art du dessin [Leonardo, l'arte del disegno] (in French). Translated by Temperini, Renaud. Paris: Citadelles et Mazenod. pp. 155–190. ISBN 978-2-85088-725-3.
- Richter, Jean-Paul (1883). The Literary Works of Leonardo da Vinci. Vol. 1. Londres: Sampson Low. p. 544.
- Viatte, Françoise (2003a). Entries. Vol. xiv-786. Translated by Todd, Jane Marie. New York: Metropolitan Museum of Art; Yale University Press. pp. 242–722. ISBN 978-1-5883-9034-9.
- Viatte, Françoise (2003b). Léonard de Vinci: Dessins et manuscrits (catalogue de l'exposition présentée au musée du Louvre, Paris, du 5 mai au 14 juillet 2003) (in French). Vol. 61. Paris: Réunion des Musées Nationaux. ISBN 978-2-7118-4589-7.

==== Articles ====
- Popham, Arthur (May 1952). "The Reappearance of some Leonardo Drawings". The Burlington Magazine. Vol. 590. pp. 127–132.

==== Internet sites ====
- Fine art resources:
  - Mona Lisa
  - Musée du Louvre (collections)
- Musée du Louvre, Département des Arts graphiques, "VINCI Leonardo da, Ecole florentine, Tête d'enfant de trois quarts à droite archive", on arts-graphiques.louvre.fr, 2012 (accessed 29 December 2018).

=== Related articles ===
- A Treatise on Painting
- Virgin of the Rocks
