= Madonna and Child (Boltraffio) =

Painting by Giovanni Antonio Boltraffio

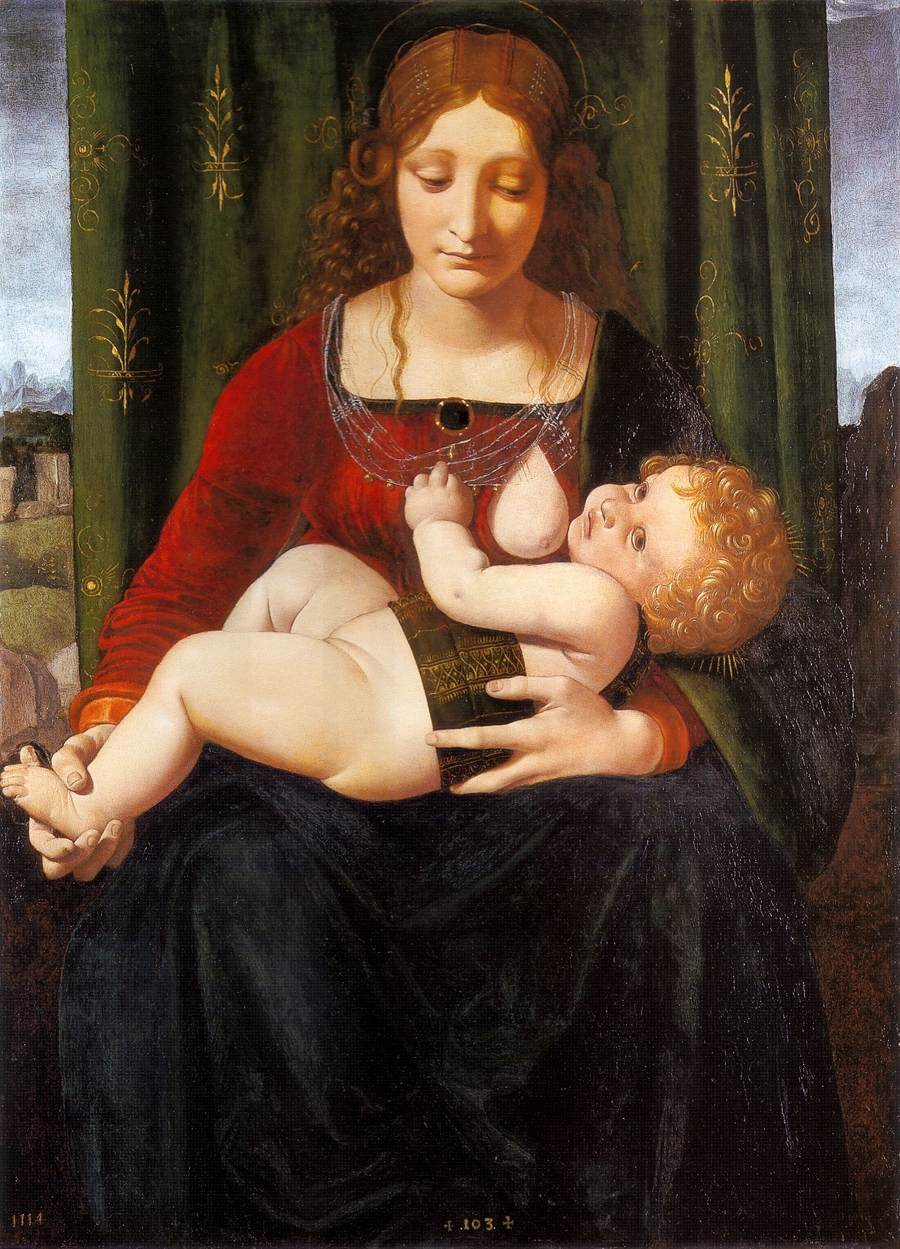
Madonna and Child (c. 1493-1499) by Giovanni Antonio Boltraffio

Madonna and Child is an oil on panel painting by Giovanni Antonio Boltraffio, now in the National Gallery, London. It was probably produced c. 1493-1499. It is influenced by Leonardo da Vinci, derived from Boltraffio's time in that artist's Milanese studio.
