= Portrait of a Man in Profile =

Painting by Giovanni Antonio Boltraffio

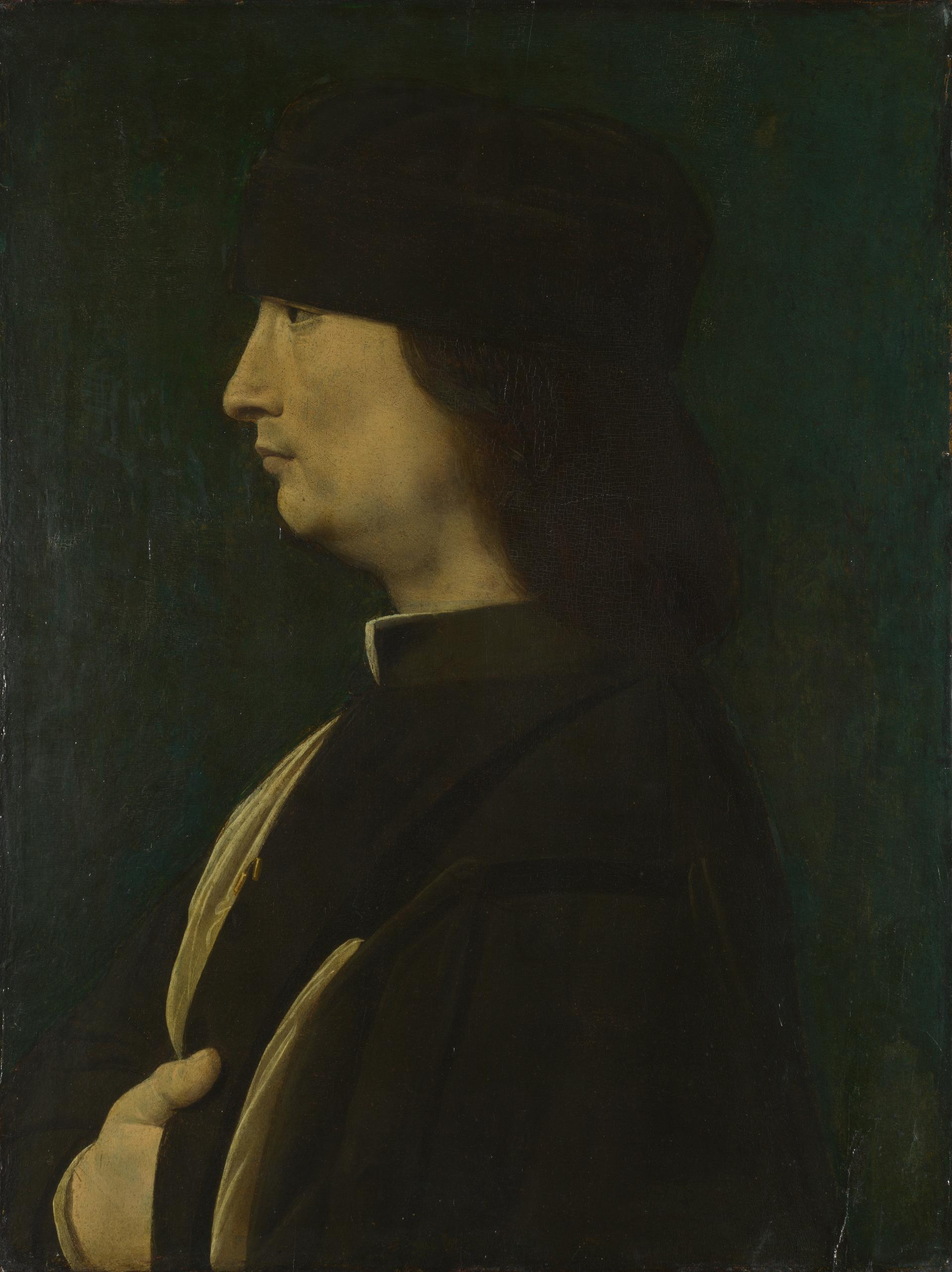
Portrait of a Man in Profile (c. 1500) by Giovanni Antonio Boltraffio

Portrait of a Man in Profile is an oil on panel painting by Giovanni Antonio Boltraffio, created c. 1500. It is held in the National Gallery, in London. Its subject's identity is unknown, but it may be the artist's Bolognese friend Girolamo Casio. Its profile pose is typical of the Milanese School, in which the artist worked.
