= Madonna and Child (Boltraffio, 1495) =

Painting by Giovanni Antonio Boltraffio

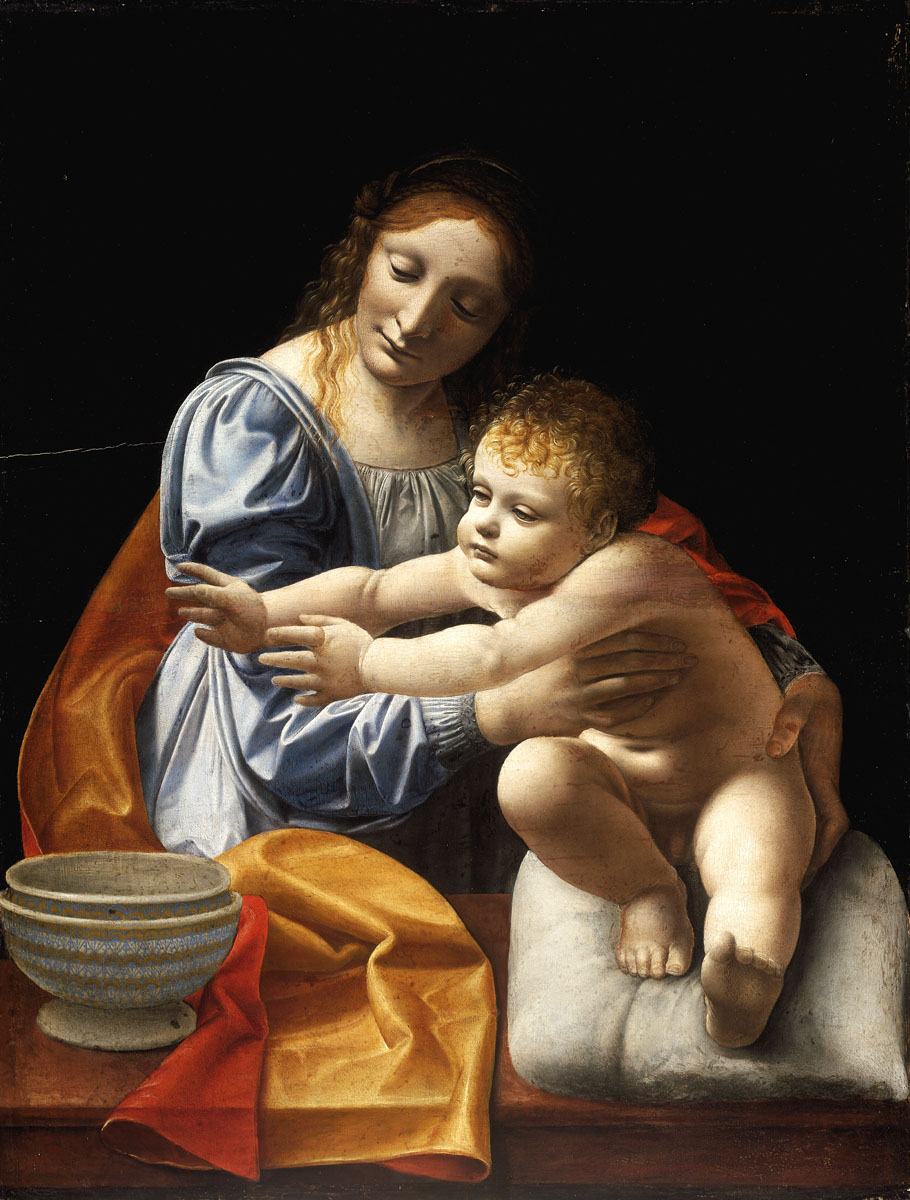
- Artist: Giovanni Antonio Boltraffio
- Year: 1495-96
- Medium: Oil on wood
- Dimensions: 83 cm × 63.4 cm (33 in × 25.0 in)
- Location: Museum of Fine Arts; Budapest

Madonna and Child is an oil on canvas painting of 1485–90 by the Italian artist Giovanni Antonio Boltraffio. It is said by some scholars to be "the finest Leonardesque picture not painted by Leonardo himself. Sfumato is evident in the work. The wood upon which it was painted comes from the same batch as Leonardo's own Virgin of the Rocks. It was once believed the painting was unfinished (further details upon the faience bowl), but that has now been disproven.
