= Litta (family) =

Milanese noble family

- Coat of arms of the Litta
- Cadet branches: Litta Modignani; Litta Visconti Arese; Litta Biumi

The Litta are an ancient noble Milanese family who produced two cardinals, Alfonso Litta and Lorenzo Litta. The Litta became Marquesses in XVII century and Dukes in 1810.

== See also ==
- Palazzo Litta, Milan
- Madonna Litta
