= Virgin of the Rocks =

Two paintings by Leonardo da Vinci

Paris version
- Vergine delle rocce (Italian)
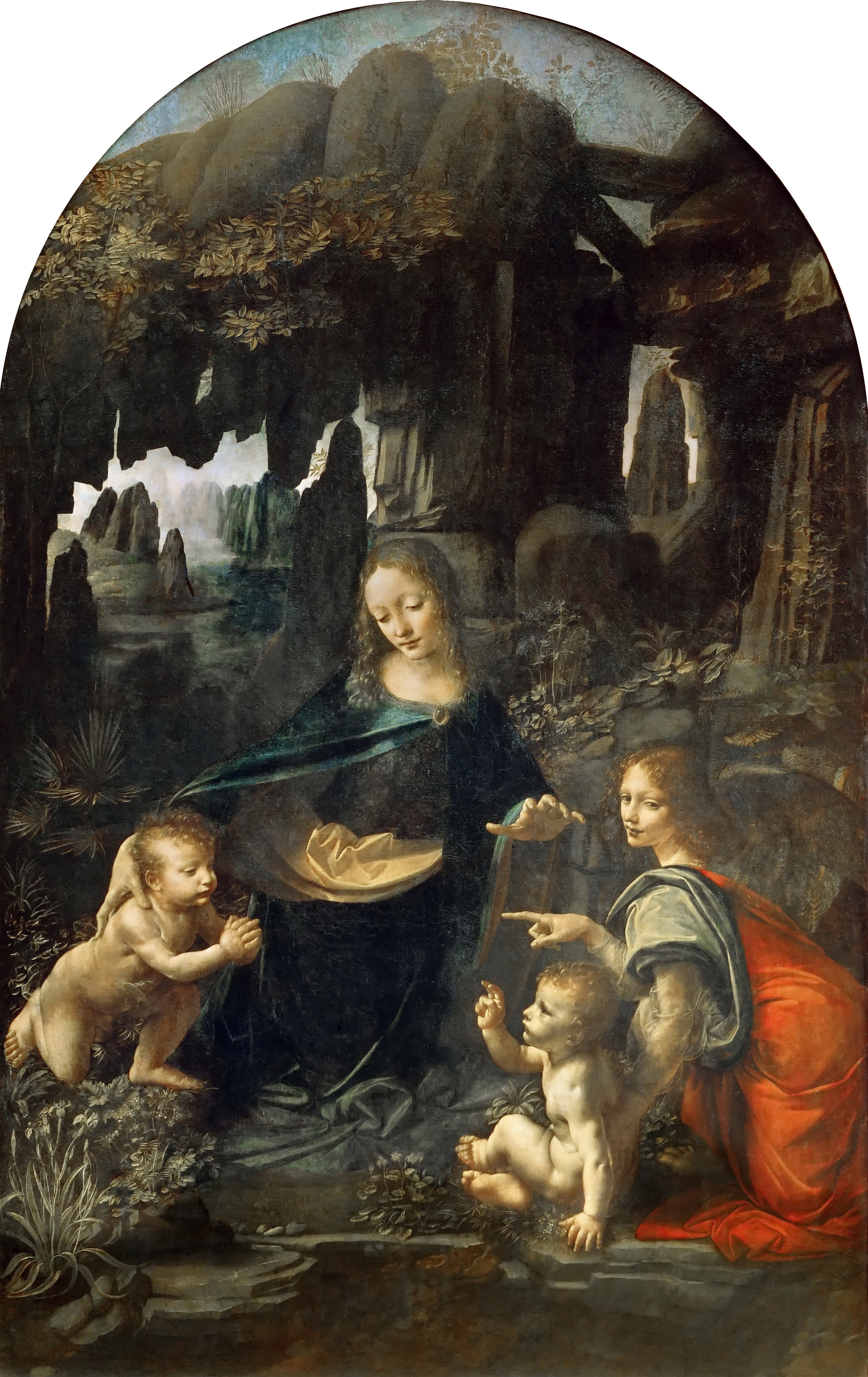
- Artist: Leonardo da Vinci
- Year: 1483–1486
- Type: Oil on panel (transferred to canvas)
- Dimensions: 199 cm × 122 cm (78.3 in × 48.0 in)
- Location: Louvre, Paris

London version
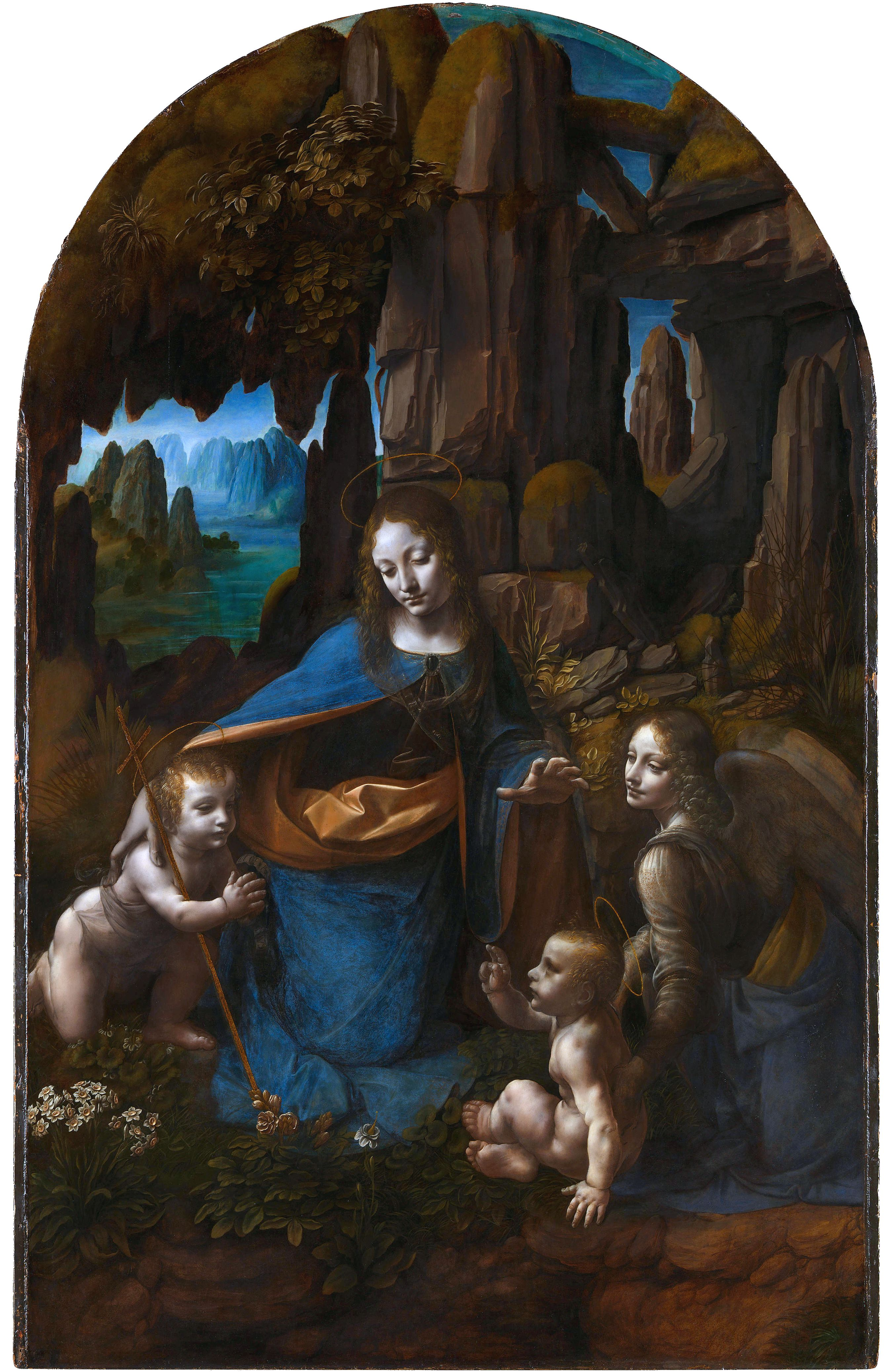
- Artists: Leonardo da Vinci and other(s)
- Year: 1495–1508
- Medium: Oil on panel
- Dimensions: 189.5 cm × 120 cm (74.6 in × 47.25 in)
- Location: National Gallery, London

The Virgin of the Rocks (Italian: Vergine delle rocce), sometimes the Madonna of the Rocks, is the name of two paintings by the Italian Renaissance artist Leonardo da Vinci, of the same subject, with a composition which is identical except for several significant details. The version generally considered the prime version, the earlier of the two, is unrestored and hangs in the Louvre in Paris. The other, which was restored between 2008 and 2010, hangs in the National Gallery, London. The works are often known as the Louvre Virgin of the Rocks and London Virgin of the Rocks respectively. The paintings are both nearly 2 metres (over 6 feet) high and are painted in oils. Both were originally painted on wooden panels, but the Louvre version has been transferred to canvas.

Both paintings show the Virgin Mary and child Jesus with the infant John the Baptist and an angel Uriel, in a rocky setting which gives the paintings their usual name. The significant compositional differences are in the gaze and right hand of the angel. There are many minor ways in which the works differ, including the colours, the lighting, the flora, and the way in which sfumato has been used. Although the date of an associated commission is documented, the complete histories of the two paintings are unknown.

Two further paintings are associated with the commission: side panels each containing an angel playing a musical instrument and completed by associates of Leonardo. These are both in the National Gallery, London.

== The paintings ==
=== Louvre version ===
The Virgin of the Rocks in the Louvre is considered by most art historians to be the earlier of the two and dates from around 1483–1486. Most authorities agree that the work is entirely by Leonardo. It is about 8 cm (3 in) taller than the London version. The first certain record of this picture dates from 1625, when it was in the French royal collection. It is generally accepted that this painting was produced to fulfill a commission of 1483 in Milan. It is hypothesised that this painting was privately sold by Leonardo and that the London version was painted at a later date to fill the commission. There are a number of other theories to explain the existence of two paintings. This painting is regarded as a perfect example of Leonardo's "sfumato" technique.

=== London version ===
A very similar painting in the National Gallery, London, is also ascribed to Leonardo da Vinci, and ascribed a date before 1508. Originally thought to have been partially painted by Leonardo's assistants, a close inspection of the painting during the recent restoration between 2008 and 2010 has led the conservators from the National Gallery to conclude that the work is by the hand of Leonardo.

It was painted for the chapel of the Confraternity of the Immaculate Conception, in the church of San Francesco Maggiore in Milan. It was sold by the church, very likely in 1781, and certainly by 1785, when it was bought by Gavin Hamilton, who took it to England. After passing through various collections, it was bought by the National Gallery in 1880.

=== Angels ===
Two paintings of angels playing musical instruments are believed to have been part of the composition that was set into the altarpiece. These two pictures, now in the National Gallery, London, are thought to have been completed between 1490 and 1495. One, an angel in red, is thought to be the work of Ambrogio de Predis while the angel in green is thought to be the work of a different assistant of Leonardo, perhaps Francesco Napoletano.

== History ==
=== Chapel of the Immaculate Conception ===
The Chapel of the Immaculate Conception was founded prior to 1335 by Beatrice d'Este, wife of Gian Galeazzo Visconti, Duke of Milan. The chapel was attached to the church of San Francesco Grande, Milan.

In 1479 the Confraternity of the Immaculate Conception contracted Francesco Zavattari and Giorgio della Chiesa to decorate the vault of the chapel. In 1480 the Confraternity of the Immaculate Conception contracted Giacomo del Maino to create a large wooden altarpiece with spaces for paintings and with carvings and decoration, to be placed above the altar of the chapel. Final payment was to be made on August 7, 1482.

=== Commission for the painting ===
On April 25, 1483, Prior Bartolomeo Scorlione and the Confraternity contracted Leonardo da Vinci, and the brothers Ambrogio and Evangelista de Predis to provide the painted panels for the altarpiece. The contract was not explicit about what each artist was to do. Leonardo was referred to in the contract as "Master". Ambrogio de Predis was also a painter. It is presumed that Evangelista de Predis was a gilder and assisted in preparing the colours.

The details of the painting, colouring and gilding are set out in the contract. The central panel was to be a painting showing the Virgin Mary and Christ child, with two prophets, probably David and Isaiah, surrounded by angels. Above them was to be a lunette containing a relief panel of God and the Virgin Mary, beneath which was a panel showing the crib. The relief figures were to be brightly painted and gilded. To either side of the central painting were to be painted panels showing four angelic musicians on one side and four singing angels on the other. A number of sculptured relief panels were to depict the life of the Virgin Mary. Details of the colours and the gilding of the major parts were specified in the contract.

The due date of installation was December 8, 1483, the Feast Day of the Immaculate Conception, giving seven months for its completion.

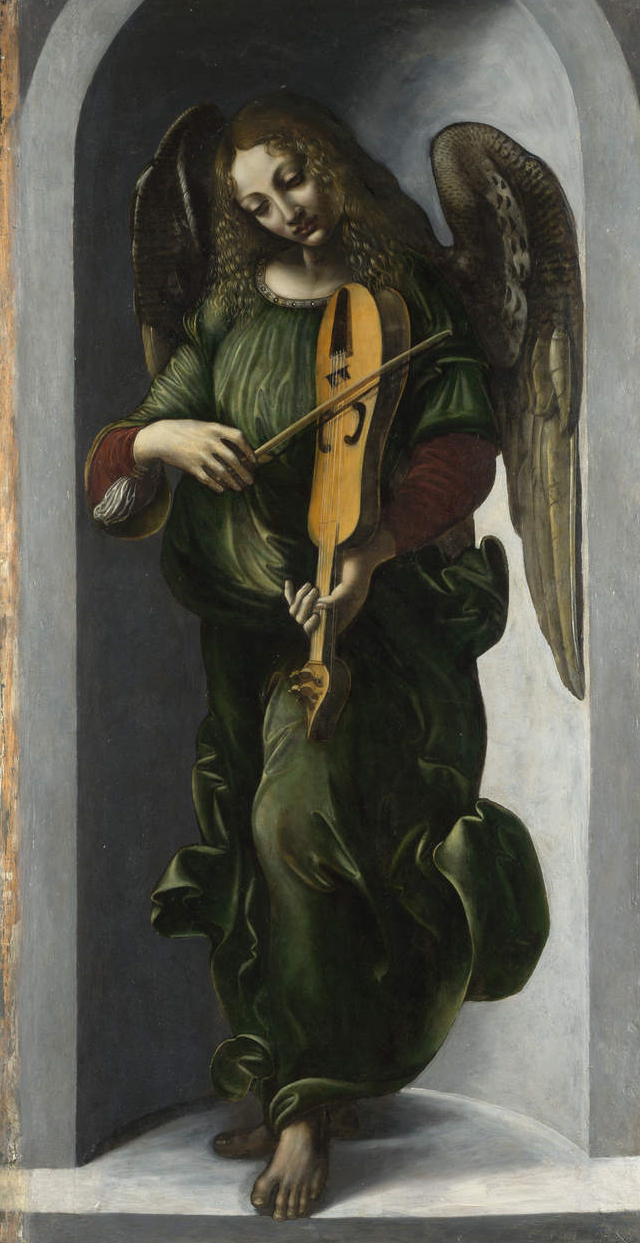
Angel by an unknown painter, perhaps Bernardino Luini or Francesco Napoletano

Angel probably by Ambrogio de Predis.

=== Payment ===
On May 1, 1483, there was an initial payment of 100 Lire. This was followed by payments of 40 Lire per month from July 1483 until February 1485 totalling 800 Lire. A final payment was to be negotiated upon completion and delivery of the work in December 1483.

Between 1490 and 1495, Ambrogio and Leonardo wrote to the Confraternity stating that the centrepiece had cost the whole 800 Lire and they asked for a further 1,200 Lire, according to the contract. The Confraternity offered them only 100 Lire as a result of the petition. Leonardo and Ambrogio then requested Ludovico Sforza, the Duke of Milan, to intervene on their behalf. It was suggested that the altarpiece should be assessed by experts and evaluated, for the final payment. The artists also suggested that if an agreement over price could not be met, then they should remove the artwork.

In 1503 Ambrogio again appealed for payment, on his own behalf and that of the heirs of his now deceased brother, Evangelista. On March 9, 1503, Louis XII of France, who had invaded Lombardy in 1499, wrote to the commander of Milan requesting that he intervene on behalf of the artists. On June 23, 1503, the Confraternity set out a deed contesting de Predis' request for evaluation or return of the painting. On April 27, 1506, an evaluation was made. It was judged that the work was still incomplete. Leonardo was requested to finish it, but he was still absent from Milan.

On August 18, 1508, the painting was delivered and put into place. On August 7, 1507, and October 23, 1508, Ambrogio received two payments totalling 200 Lire. The receipt of this payment is acknowledged in correspondence by Leonardo.

=== 1524–2011 ===
==== National Gallery painting ====
In 1524 and 1576 The Virgin of the Rocks in the Chapel of the Immaculate Conception, presumably the London version, was invoked against the plague. In 1576, the altarpiece was removed from the chapel, which was demolished. In mid-1785, Gavin Hamilton, a Scottish painter and dealer, paid 1,582 Lire to purchase the Virgin of the Rocks from Alessandro, Count Cicogna, administrator of the religious body which succeeded the Confraternity of the Immaculate Conception. Hamilton's heirs sold the painting to Lord Lansdowne, who had amassed considerable debts. After his death in 1805, his son John was forced to sell nearly all of his father's collections and the painting was purchased by the 15th Earl of Suffolk. In 1880, the painting was sold by the 18th Earl of Suffolk to the National Gallery for 9,000 guineas. It was reported at that time to be in a poor state and was attributed by some critics to Leonardo and by others to Bernardino Luini.

In June 2005, the painting was examined by infra-red reflectogram. This imaging revealed a draft of a different painting beneath the visible one. The draft portrays a woman, probably kneeling, with her right hand outstretched and her left on her heart. Some researchers believe that the artist's original intention was to paint an adoration of the infant Jesus. In 2021, Oxia Palus–an artificial intelligence company specialised in the reconstruction of lost artwork–used machine learning techniques to reconstruct this pentimento using the entire oeuvre of Leonardeschi paintings. Many other pentimenti are visible under x-ray or infra-red examination.

In 2009/2010 the painting underwent cleaning and conservation work, returning to display in July 2010. The National Gallery, in a preliminary announcement of the results of the work, said that it revealed that the painting was largely, possibly entirely, by Leonardo, and unfinished in parts. The full publication of the findings was released later in 2010.

==== Louvre painting ====
In 1625 the Virgin of the Rocks now in the Louvre was seen at Fontainebleau by Cassiano dal Pozzo. In 1806, the French restorer Fr Hacquin transferred the Louvre Virgin of the Rocks from its panel onto canvas. For a brief time in 2011–12 it was hung with the London painting as part of an exhibition in the National Gallery on Leonardo's activity as painter to the court of Ludovico Sforza.

==== Side panels ====
The two panels from the completed altarpiece containing figures of angels playing musical instruments were acquired by the National Gallery, London in 1898.

== Subject ==
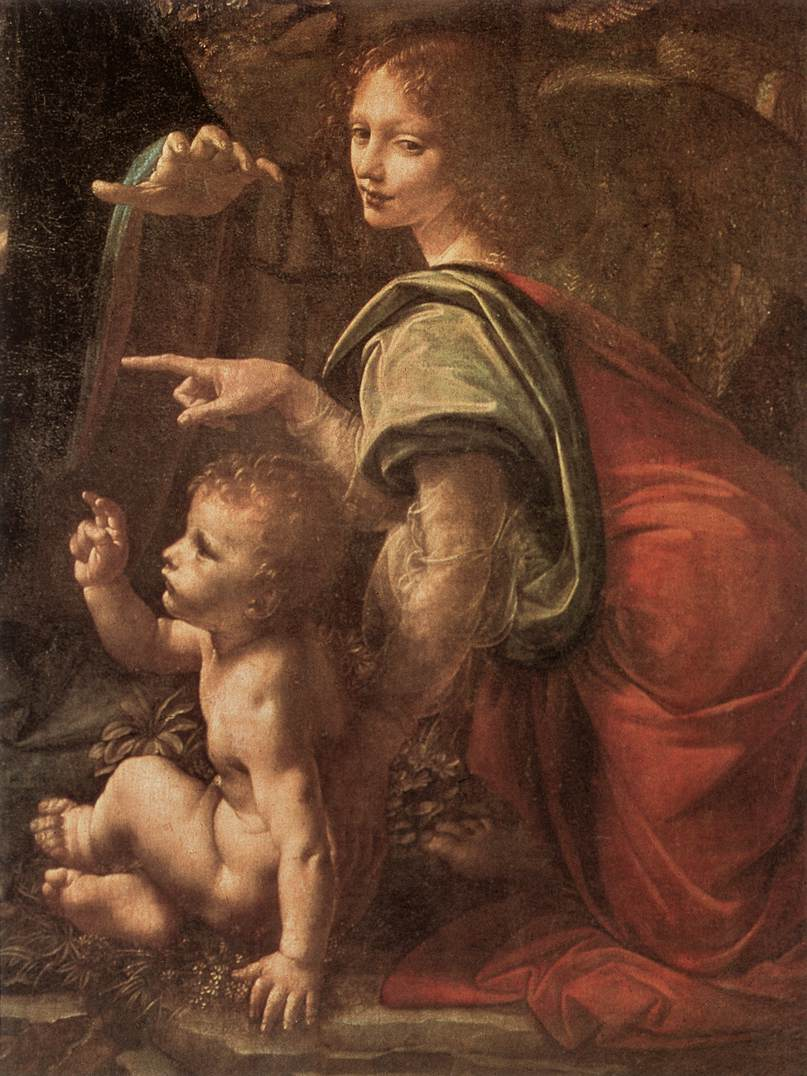
Detail of Christ Child and angel, Louvre

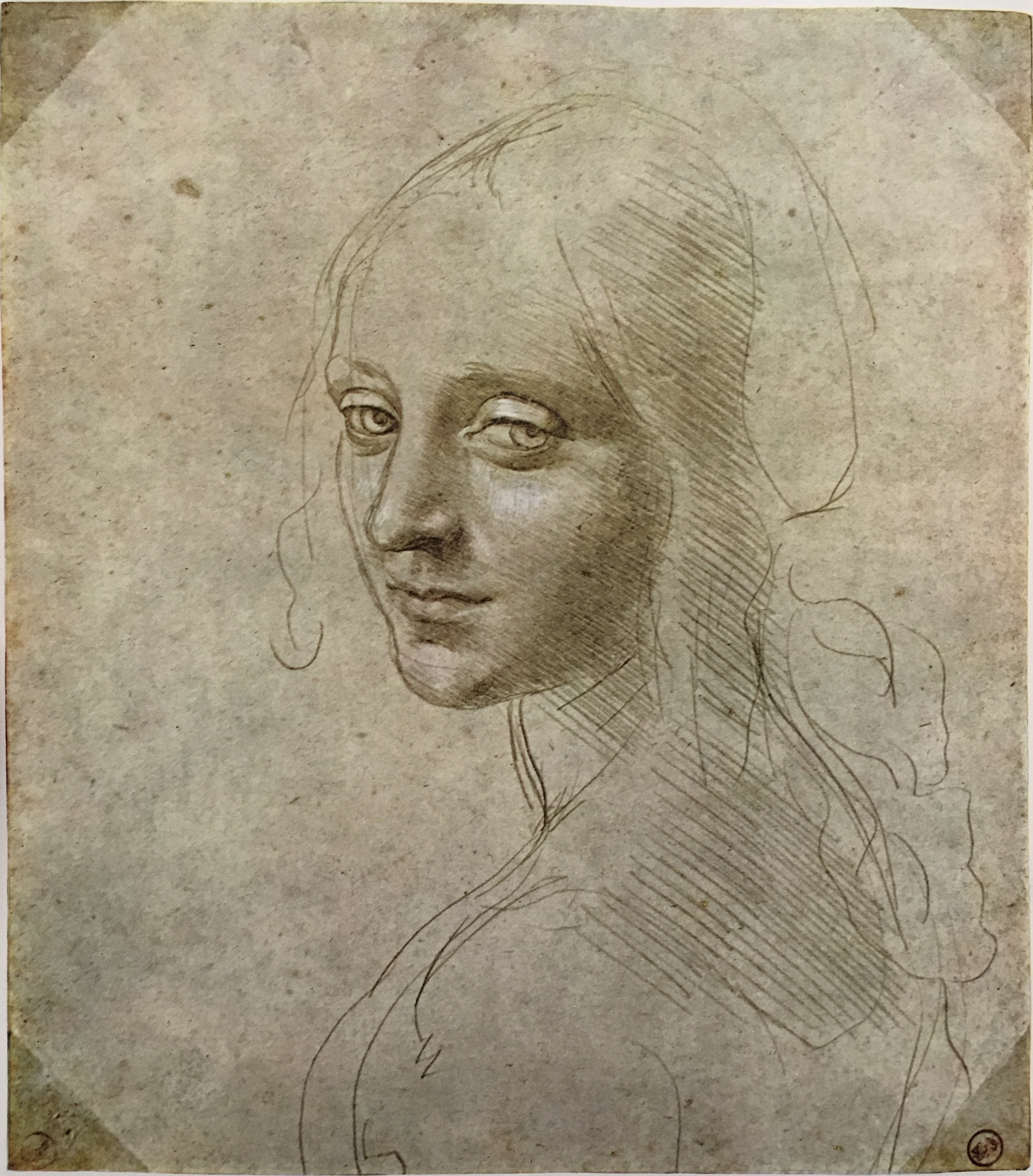
Female head study by Leonardo for the Madonna of the Rocks, Royal Library of Turin

The subject of the two paintings is the adoration of the Christ child by the infant John the Baptist. This subject relates to a non-Biblical event which became part of the medieval tradition of the Holy Family’s journey into Egypt. The Gospel of Matthew relates that Joseph, the husband of Mary, was warned in a dream that King Herod would attempt to kill the child Jesus, and that he was to take the child and his mother and flee to safety. There are a series of non-Biblical narratives that relate to the journey to Egypt. One of these concerns Jesus’ cousin, John the Baptist, whose family, like that of Jesus, resided in the town of Bethlehem where the Massacre of the Innocents was to take place. According to legend, John was escorted to Egypt by the Archangel Uriel, and met the holy family on the road. The Louvre website refers to the angel in the painting as "Gabriel" (but the description of the painting in the Louvre still refers to Uriel). This accords with the Apocryphal gospel of John the Baptist, which describes his removal from Bethlehem as by Gabriel rather than Uriel and does not mention the meeting on the road to Egypt.

The subject of the Virgin Mary with the Christ child being adored by John the Baptist was common in the art of Renaissance Florence. John the Baptist is the patron saint of Florence and has often been depicted in the art of that city. Those who painted and sculpted the subject of the Mary and child with St John include Fra Filippo Lippi, Raphael, and Michelangelo.

In both paintings the scene is depicted taking place against a background of rock formations. While scenes of the Nativity were sometimes depicted as taking place in a cave, and Kenneth Clark points to the existence of an earlier rocky landscape in an adoration painted for the Medici family by Fra Filippo Lippi, the setting was unprecedented and gave to the paintings their usual name of the Virgin of the Rocks.

== Description ==
=== Composition ===
The two paintings of the Virgin of the Rocks that now belong to the National Gallery, London, and that belonging to the Louvre Museum, Paris, are the same in subject matter and in overall composition, indicating that one is derivative of the other. The two paintings differ in compositional details, in colour, in lighting and in the handling of the paint.

Both paintings show a grouping of four figures, the Virgin Mary, the Christ child, the infant John the Baptist and an angel arranged into a triangular composition within the painting and set against a background of rocks, and a distant landscape of mountains and water. In both paintings, Mary makes the apex of the pyramidal figure group, stretching one hand to include John and raising the other above the head of the Christ child in a blessing. John kneels, gazing towards the Christ child with his hands together in an attitude of prayer. The Christ child sits towards the front of the painting, supported by the angel, and raising his right hand in a sign of Benediction towards the kneeling John.

=== Differences ===
Compositionally, all the figures are slightly larger in the London painting than in the Louvre painting. The main compositional difference between the two paintings is that while in the London painting the angel's right hand rests on his/her knee, in the Louvre painting the hand is raised, the index finger pointing at John. The eyes of the angel are turned down in a contemplative manner in the London painting, but in the Louvre picture are turned to gaze in the general direction of the viewer.

In the London painting, all the forms are more defined, including the bodily forms of the clothed figures. The rocks are painted in meticulous detail, while the forms of the background in the painting in the Louvre are all more hazy. The contrast between light and shade on the figures and faces in the London painting are all much sharper. The faces and forms in the Louvre painting are more delicately painted and subtly blurred by sfumato. The lighting in the Louvre painting is softer and appears warmer, but this may be the result of the tone of the varnish on the surface. In keeping with their conservative handling of Leonardo's works, the Louvre version has not undergone significant restoration or cleaning. The Louvre painting remains much as it was in 1939 when Kenneth Clark lamented that "We can form no real conception of the colour, the values, or the general tone of the original, buried as it is under layer upon layer of thick yellow varnish. In the darks some mixture of bitumen has made the surface cake and crack like mud, and there are innumerable patches of old repaint all over the picture. All this must be borne in mind before we say that at this date Leonardo was a dark painter and an uninteresting colourist."

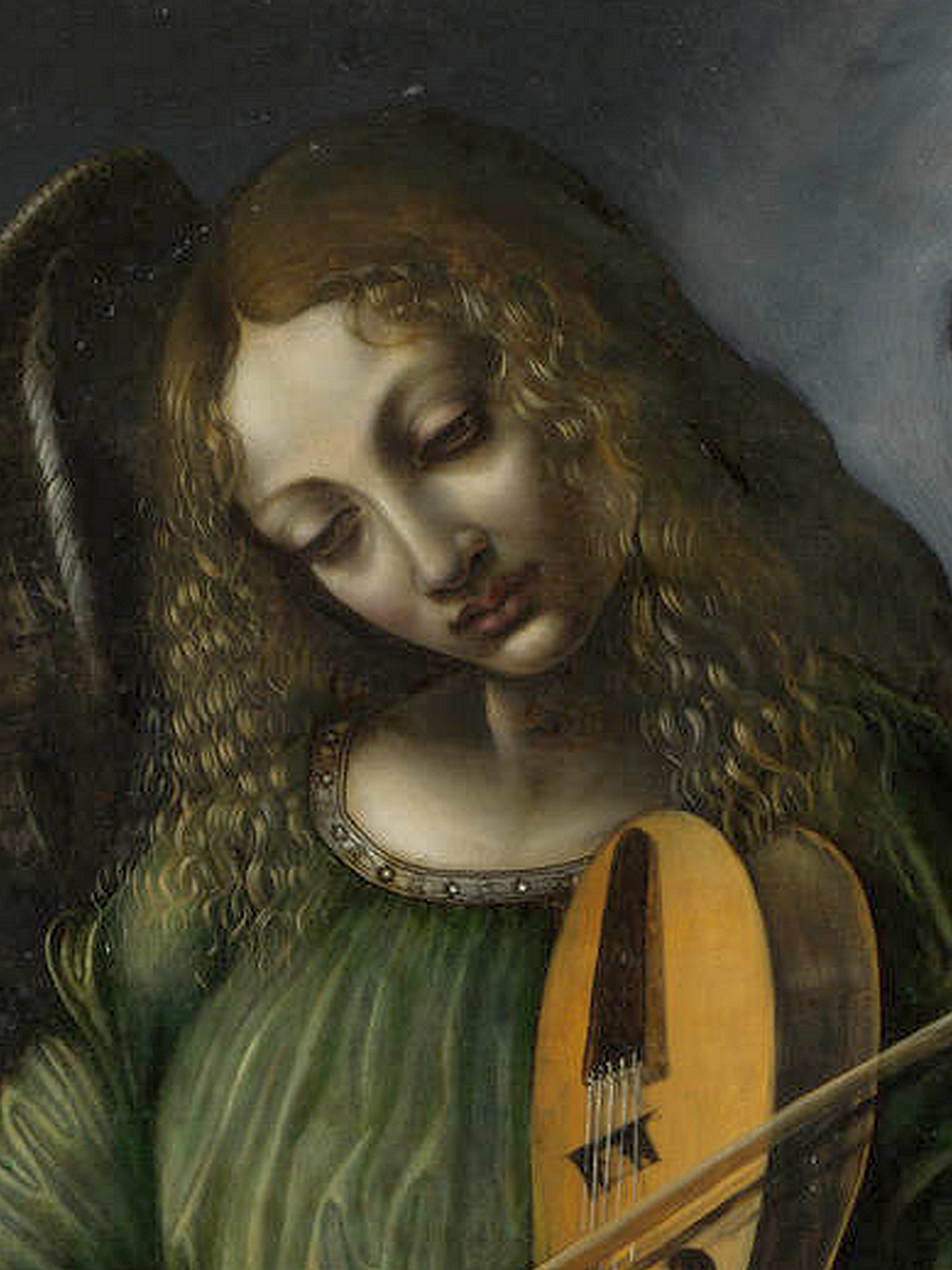
Detail of green angel

Another difference is in the colouring of the robes, particularly those of the angel. The London painting contains no red, while in the Louvre painting, the angel is robed in bright red and green, with the robes arranged differently from those of the angel in London. The London version contains traditional attributes missing from the Louvre version, the haloes and John's traditional cruciform reed staff. Davies says it is "not certain" if these details which are painted in gold are contemporary with the painting or have been added by a later artist. The details of the flowers are also quite different in the two paintings, with those in the Louvre painting being botanically accurate, and those in the London painting being fanciful creations.

=== Angel musicians ===
The two paintings of angels that are associated with the Virgin of the Rocks and are in the National Gallery do not properly fulfil the original commission for two panels each showing four angels, singing on one side and playing musical instruments on the other. There are only two musicians, both turned the same direction and both playing musical instruments. One, in green, plays a vielle, and the other, in red, plays a lute. The positions of the feet and the drapery are similar, indicating that the same design has in part been utilised for both. The angel in red is thought to be the work of Ambrogio de Predis. The angel in green is the work of an unknown associate of Leonardo. The National Gallery suggests that it might be the work of Francesco Napoletano.

In both cases the angel is standing in a grey painted niche. A reflectogram of the Angel in green with a Vielle revealed part of a painted landscape. The background of the Angel in red with a Lute could not be determined because the grey paint on that painting is thick and opaque. While it is commonly thought that the two angel panels were originally placed on either side of the central panel, an article published by the National Gallery suggests that they were placed higher up on the altarpiece.

== Interpretation ==
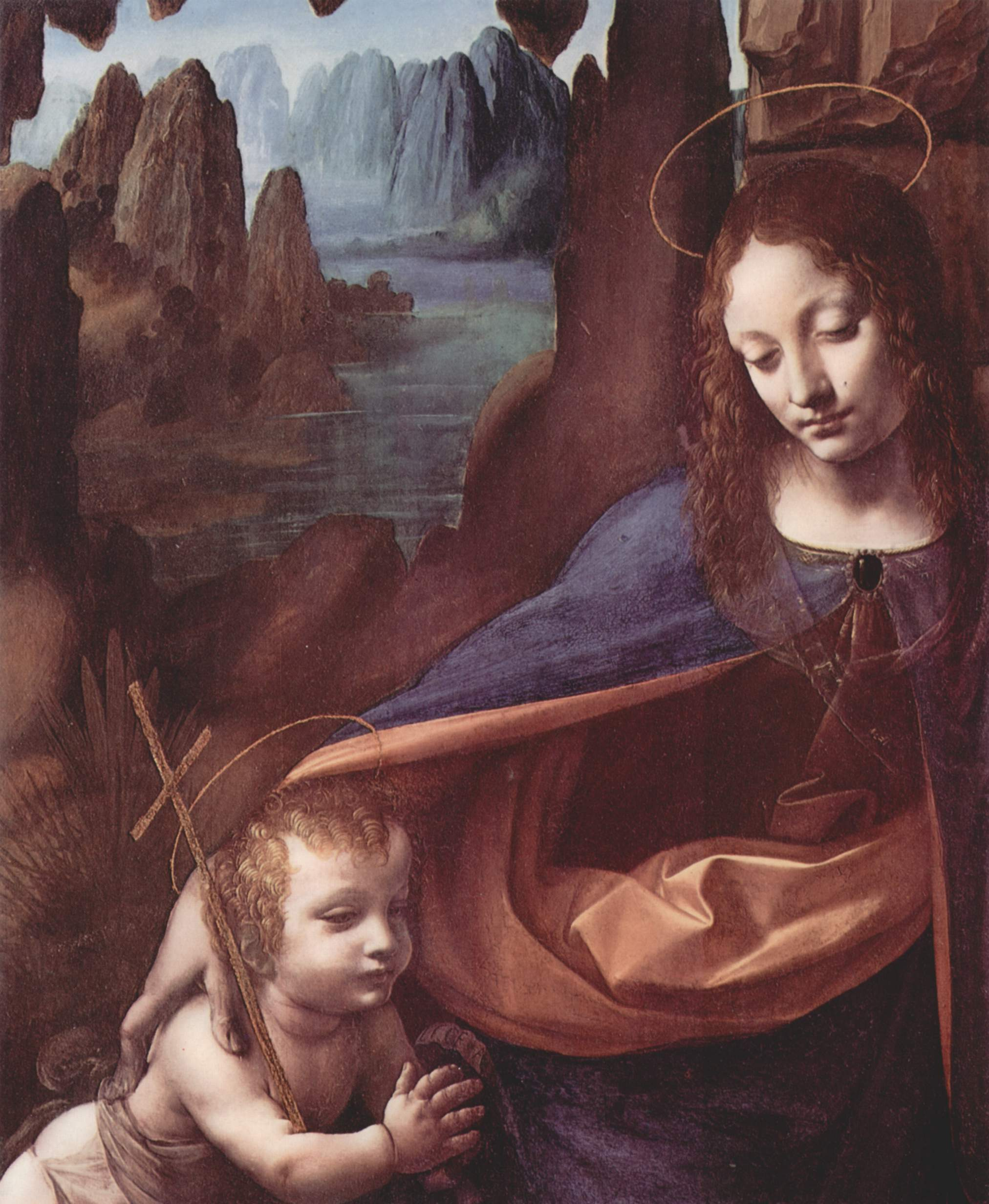
Detail, London

The relationship between the two paintings “remains much debated”. Matters of debate include the dates of the two paintings, their authorship and the nature of their symbolism. For a few months in 2011 and 2012 the two paintings were brought together, possibly for the first time, in the same room in an exhibition at the National Gallery.

=== Dates ===
It is generally accepted by art historians that the Louvre version is the earlier work. Martin Davies, former director of the National Gallery, described the painting in the Louvre as being stylistically close to Leonardo's earlier works and the London painting more suggestive of his maturer style, and therefore the later of the two, and derivative of the Louvre painting. Most authors agree that the Louvre painting was the one that was painted to fulfil the commission of 1483.

Some writers, including Martin Davies, feel that 1483 is too late a date for the Louvre version, and suggest that the painting had already been begun and perhaps completed in Florence before the commission. Wasserman, Ottino della Chiesa and others have pointed out that the measurements of both paintings are compatible with the altarpiece, and that it is an unlikely coincidence that Leonardo painted a picture that fitted the dimensions, at a time prior to the commission. Wasserman suggests that perhaps the Louvre painting was extended to fit the arched shape, and that the joint is no longer visible since the painting was transferred to canvas in the 19th century. Davies suggests that Leonardo painted the second version in the 1480s to fulfil the commission, and based it on the earlier work. Kenneth Clark agrees with this interpretation, placing the Louvre painting prior to 1481 and the London painting from 1483.

The theory that is most commonly used to explain the existence of the two paintings is that Leonardo painted the Louvre Virgin of the Rocks to fulfil the commission, giving it a date of 1483, and that he then sold it to another client, and painted the London version as a replacement. In line with this theory, it is hypothesised that the Louvre painting was sold in the late 1480s, after some haggling over the final payment. The London painting was commenced in perhaps 1486 as a substitution for the "original" Louvre version, and was not ready for installation until 1508, after prolonged disagreement and negotiation. This explanation, which della Chiesa attributes to Venturi and Poggi, has gained wide acceptance, and is the version of events described on both the National Gallery and the Louvre websites. Martin Kemp dates the Louvre painting to 1483–1490 and the London painting to 1495–1508.

Not all authors agree with either the dating or the theory that the Louvre painting was the earlier, was sold, and the London painting done as a substitute. Taylor asserts that the London painting is stylistically the earlier of the two, being more meticulous, in keeping with the product of Leonardo's Florentine training, while the Louvre painting has more in common with the Last Supper and the Virgin and Child with St Anne, including the delicate use of sfumato. Taylor argues that the London painting fulfils the requirements of the commission of 1483 in terms of iconography, and that the iconography of the Louvre painting indicates that it was painted for an entirely different clientele, and gives it a date in the 1490s.

=== Authorship ===
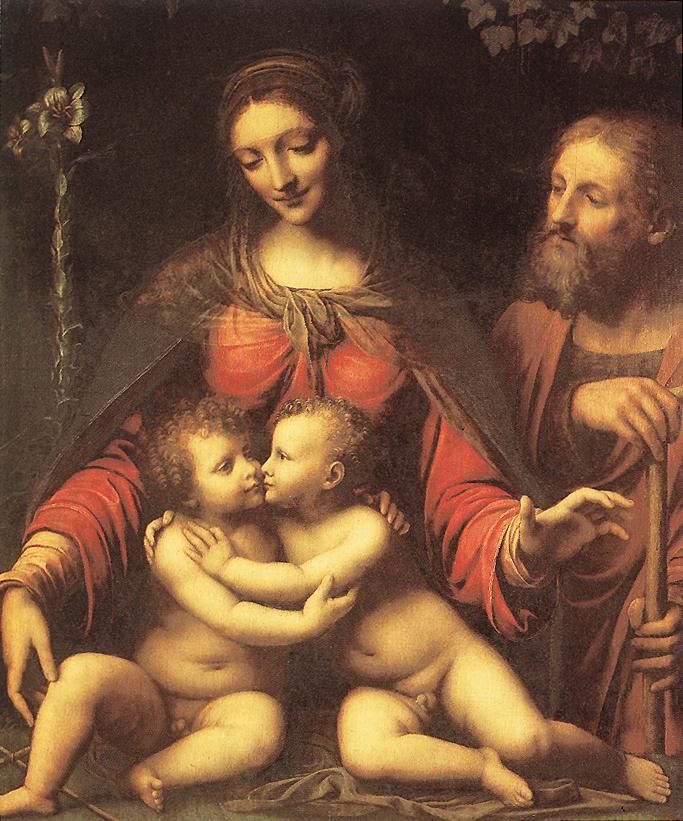
Bernardino Luini, The Holy Family with St. John. Museo del Prado, Madrid

It has always been agreed that the Louvre Virgin of the Rocks is entirely by the hand of Leonardo da Vinci. The Virgin of the Rocks in London has generally been seen as having been designed by Leonardo and executed with the assistants. The Louvre website and various authors suggest that the entire painting is by Ambrogio de Predis, painted under Leonardo's supervision between 1485 and 1508, or perhaps largely the work of de Predis, with minor intervention by Leonardo.

Since the recent cleaning, National Gallery curator Luke Syson has stated that the quality which has been revealed indicates that the work is mostly from the hand of Leonardo, and that participation of members of Leonardo's workshop was almost certainly less than previously thought.

Geologist Ann C. Pizzorusso argues that there are geological inaccuracies in the London version, unlike the Louvre version, which mean it is unlikely to have come from Leonardo's hand. Taylor disputes this, drawing attention to the fact that, at the time of writing, Pizzorusso had plainly not seen the glacial lakes to which she referred, and had mistaken clumps of moss for sandstone boulders.

== Copies and derivations ==
One of the earliest known direct copies of the Louvre version is actually an altar cloth called the Paliotto leonardesco (ca 1487–90) housed in the Museo Baroffio, and the other is a painting (ca 1494–8) located in the Cheramy Collection, believed by Carlo Pedretti to be created by Leonardo's own hand. In her 1967 book (published in English in 1985) Angela Ottino della Chiesa identifies four paintings derived to some degree from The Virgin of the Rocks: the Holy Family and St. John by Bernardino Luini in the Museo del Prado in Madrid, the Thuelin Madonna by Marco d'Oggiono in the Thuelin collection in Paris and the Holy Infants Embracing by Joos van Cleve in the Capodimonte Museum in Naples. This image was much copied by Flemish artists including Joos van Cleve and Quentin Matsys – there is a small painting in Chatsworth by the latter. There is also a smaller copy of The Virgin of the Rocks (oil on wood) possibly by Joos van Cleve or his circle (private collection Berlin).

There is a 16th-century copy in the Royal Collection, given as a birthday present to Queen Victoria in 1847 by her husband Prince Albert.

== See also ==
- List of works by Leonardo da Vinci
- The Altarpiece in the Chapel of the Immaculate Conception
- Tête d'enfant de trois quarts à droite

== Bibliography ==
- Louvre Official Website, Virgin of the Rocks , accessed 2011-12-11
- National Gallery, London Website, Virgin of the Rocks, accessed 2012-02-06
- Daniel Arasse (1997). Leonardo da Vinci. Konecky & Konecky. ISBN 978-1-56852-198-5.
- Luciano Berti (1971). The Uffizi. Scala.
- Rachel Billinge, Luke Syson and Marika Spring, Altered Angels: Two Panels from the Immaculate Conception Altarpiece once in San Francesco Grande, Milan, accessed 2012-01-05
- Angela Ottino della Chiesa (1967). The Complete Paintings of Leonardo da Vinci. Penguin Classics of World Art series. ISBN 978-0-14-008649-2.
- Martin Davies (1961). Catalogue of the Earlier Italian Schools. National Gallery Catalogues, London. ISBN 978-0-901791-29-0.
- Frederich Hartt (1970). A History of Italian Renaissance Art. Thames and Hudson. ISBN 978-0-500-23136-4.
- Martin Kemp (2004). Leonardo. Oxford University Press. ISBN 978-0-19-280644-4.
- Pizzorusso, Ann, Leonardo's Geology: The Authenticity of the "Virgin of the Rocks, Leonardo, Vol. 29, No. 3 (1996), pp. 197–200, The MIT Press, JSTOR
- A.E. Popham (1946). The Drawings of Leonardo da Vinci. Jonathan Cape. ISBN 978-0-224-60462-8.
- Marco Rosci (1977). Leonardo. Bay Books Pty Ltd. ISBN 978-0-85835-176-9.
- Tamsyn Taylor, (2011) Leonardo da Vinci and the "Virgin of the Rocks" , accessed 2012-02-06
- Jack Wasserman (1975). Leonardo da Vinci. Abrams. ISBN 978-0-8109-0262-6.
- Frank Zollner (2003). Leonardo da Vinci: The Complete Paintings and Drawings. Taschen. ISBN 978-3-8228-1734-6. [The chapter "The Graphic Works" is by Frank Zollner & Johannes Nathan].
