= Giovanni Antonio Boltraffio =

Italian painter (1467–1516)

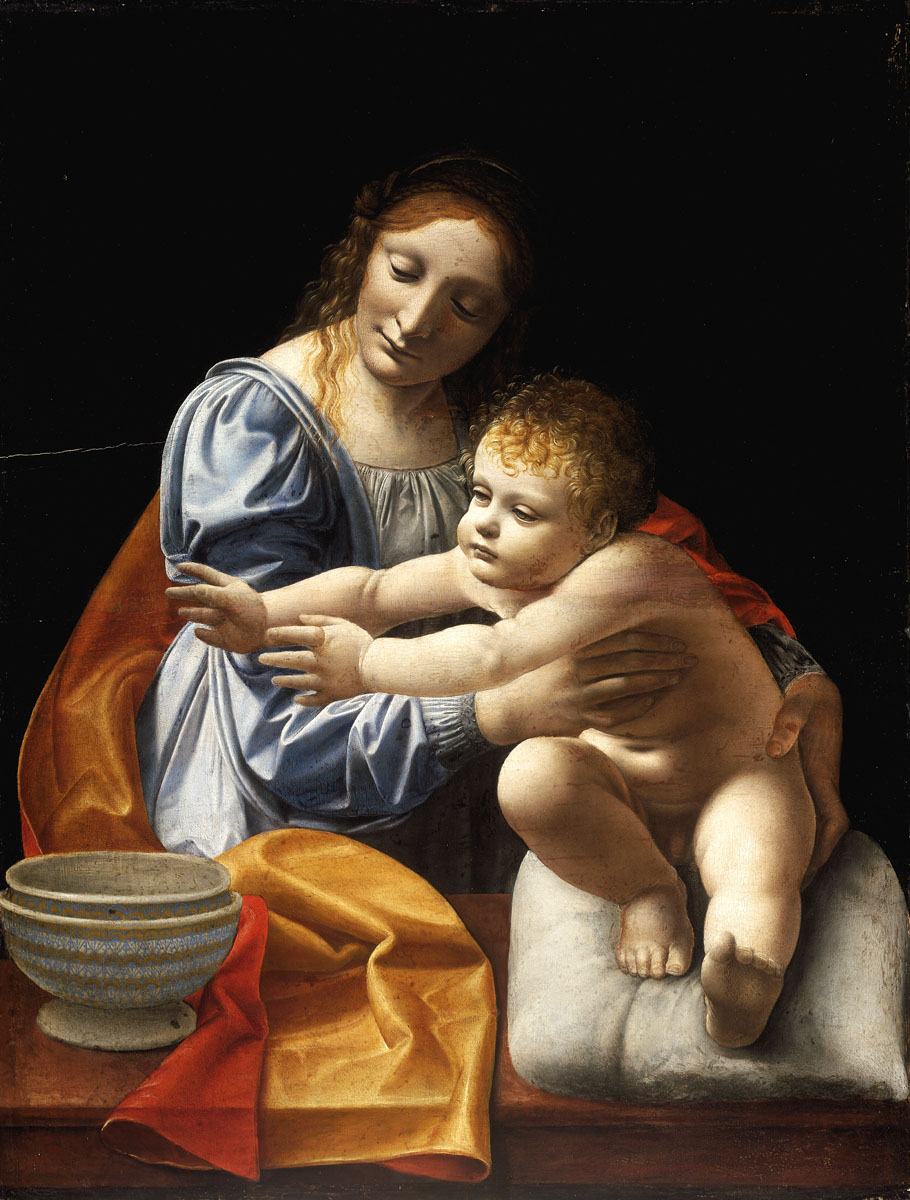
Madonna and Child (Museum of Fine Arts, Budapest)

Giovanni Antonio Boltraffio (or Beltraffio) (1466 or 1467 – 1516) was an Italian painter of the High Renaissance from Lombardy, who worked in the studio of Leonardo da Vinci. Boltraffio and Bernardino Luini are the strongest artistic personalities to emerge from Leonardo's studio. According to Giorgio Vasari, he was of an aristocratic family and was born in Milan.

== Paintings ==
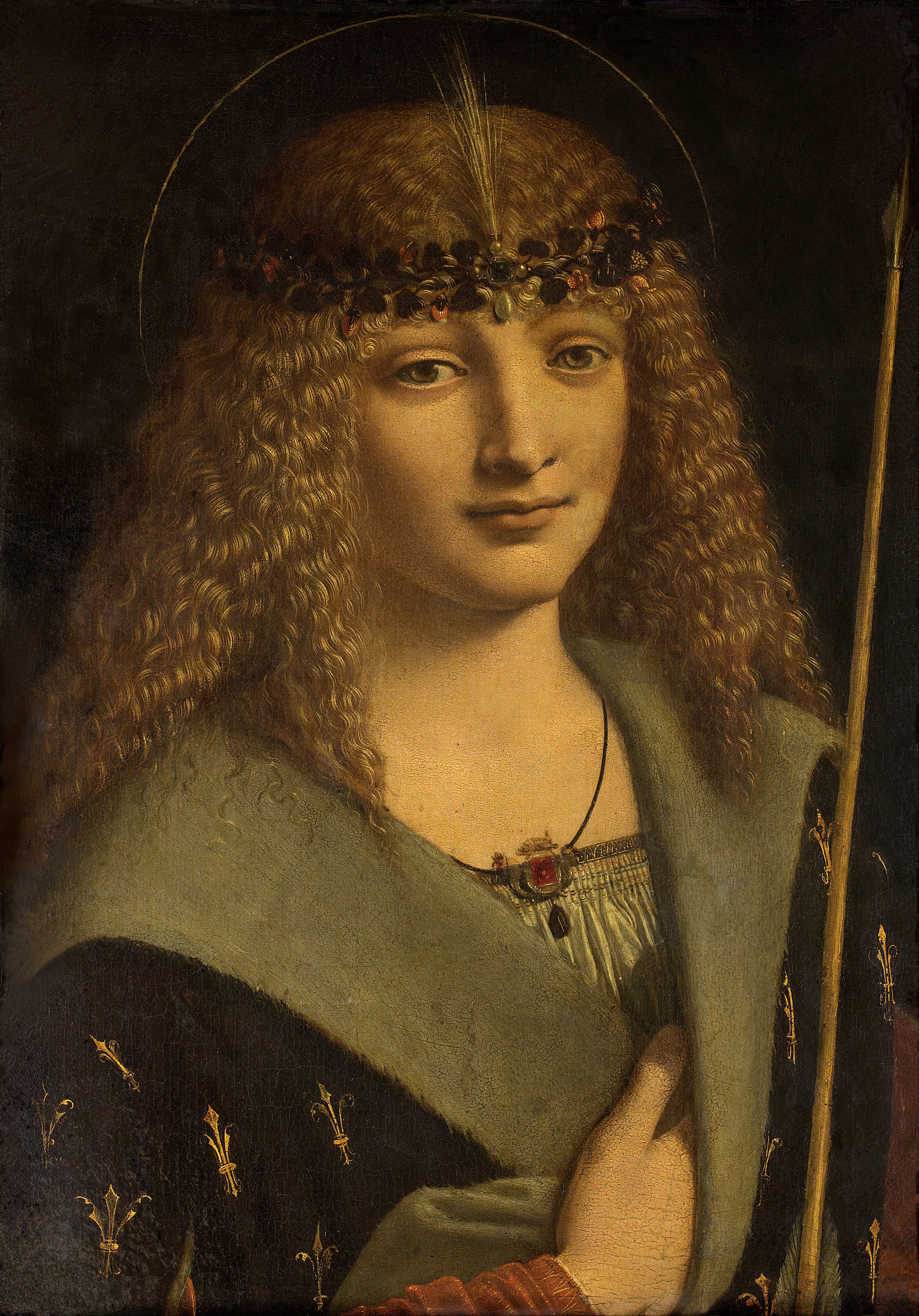
Giovanni Antonio Boltraffio, Portrait of a Boy as Saint Sebastian

His major painting of the 1490s is the Resurrection (painted with fellow da Vinci pupil Marco d'Oggiono and now in the Gemäldegalerie, Berlin). A Madonna and Child in the Museo Poldi Pezzoli of Milan, is one of the high points of the Lombard Quattrocento.

His portraits, often in profile, and his half-length renderings of the Madonna and Child are Leonardesque in conception, though the clean hard edges of his outlines lack Leonardo's sfumato.

In Bologna, where he remained in 1500–1502, he found sympathetic patrons in the Casio family, of whom he painted several portraits and for whom he produced his masterwork, the Pala Casio for the Church of the Misericordia (Louvre Museum); it depicts a Madonna and Child with John the Baptist and Saint Sebastian and two Kneeling Donors, Giacomo Marchione de' Pandolfi da Casio and his son, the Bolognese poet Girolamo Casio, who mentioned Boltraffio in some of his sonnets. Boltraffio's portrait of Girolamo Casio is at the Pinacoteca di Brera, Milan. His Portrait of a Man in Profile is in the National Gallery, London.

The standard monograph is Maria Teresa Fiorio, Giovanni Antonio Boltraffio: Un pittore milanese nel lume di Leonardo. (Milan and Rome) 2000.

== Selected works with disputed attribution ==
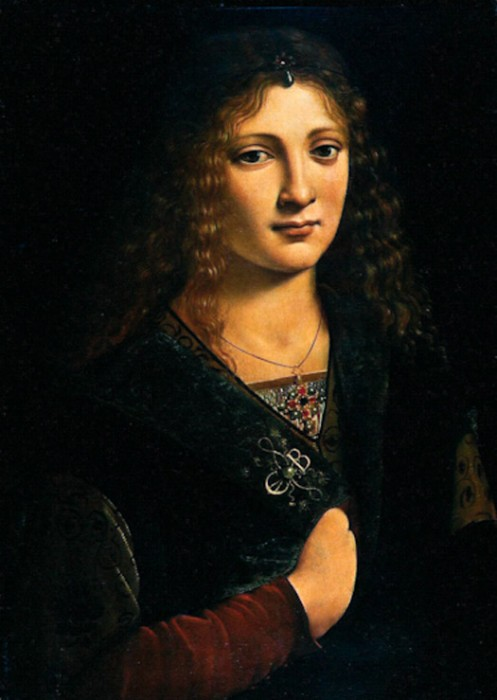
A portrait probably depicting Girolamo Casio

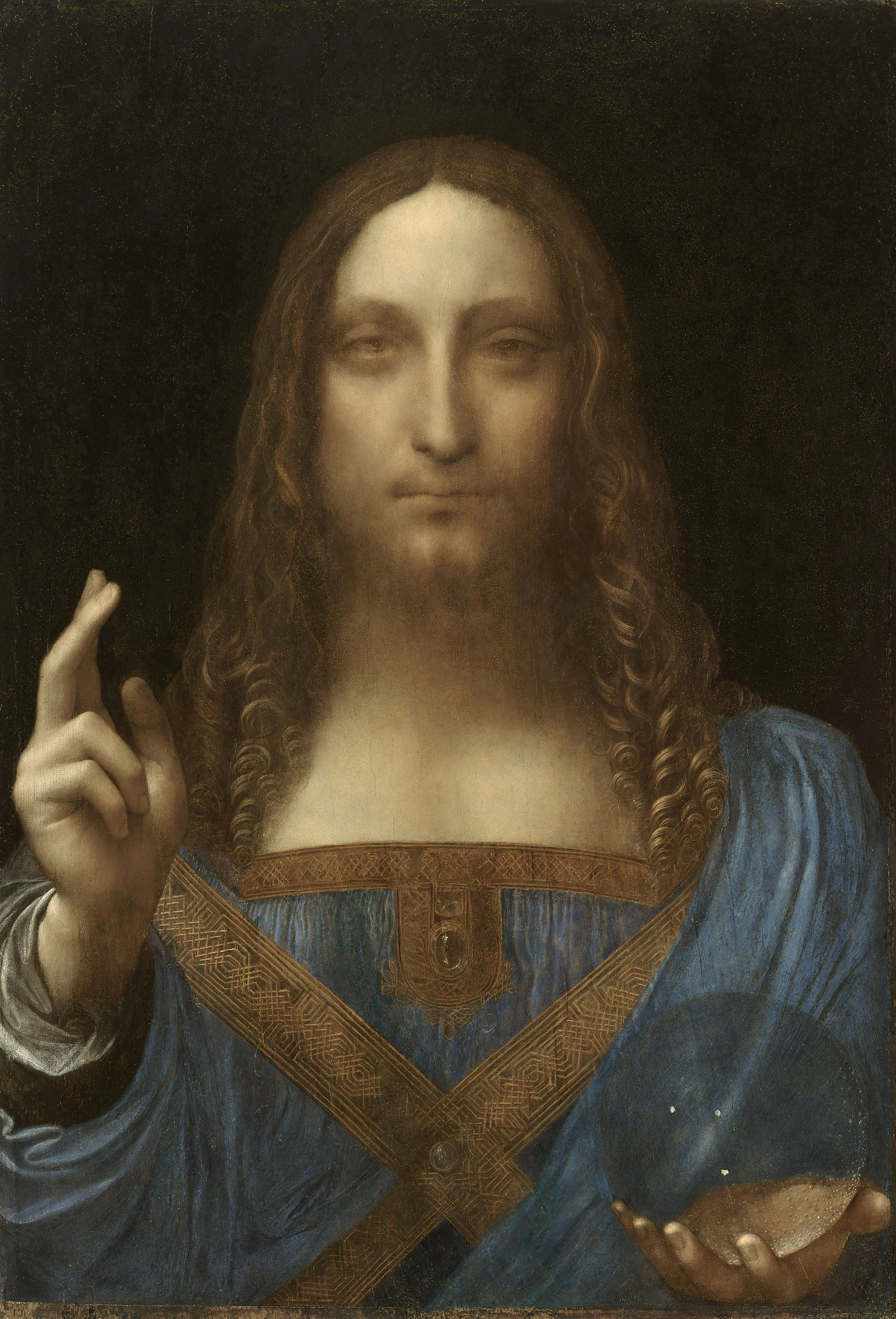
Salvator Mundi, c.1500, after restoration

- Portrait of a Young Woman with a Scorpion Chain, Columbia Museum of Art. Formerly assigned to the Louvre's Master of the Vierge aux Balances, the handsome Portrait of a Young Woman with a Scorpion Chain now in the Samuel H. Kress Collection of the Columbia Museum of Art in Columbia, SC has been reattributed to the hand of Boltraffio and dated to the period 1490–1505. Whether or not Leonardo participated in its design remains uncertain.
- Madonna Litta, (Hermitage, Saint Petersburg, sometimes attributed to Leonardo da Vinci).
- Holy family, (National Gallery in Prague, probably a copy after the unknown original).
- Virgin and child with donor, (Rome, Sant´Onofrio, Museo del Tasso, sometimes attributed to Cesare da Sesto).
- Portrait of a Man, (Fine Arts Museums of San Francisco), probably by Ambrogio de Predis.
- Virgin and Child is at the National Gallery in London.
- The Salvator Mundi from the workshop of Leonardo was attributed wholly to Boltraffio up to 2011 and some scholars continued to believe he contributed to it. By 2017 however, the consensus in the art world was that it was a Leonardo da Vinci work, although art historian Matthew Landrus maintained that the master contributed only about five to 20% of the painting with assistants such as Bernardino Luini producing the balance. Carmen Bambach of the Metropolitan Museum of Art however, continued to maintain that the work was mostly painted by Boltraffio with "small retouchings" by the master.
