= Codex Vallardi =

Collection of drawings by Antonio Pisanello

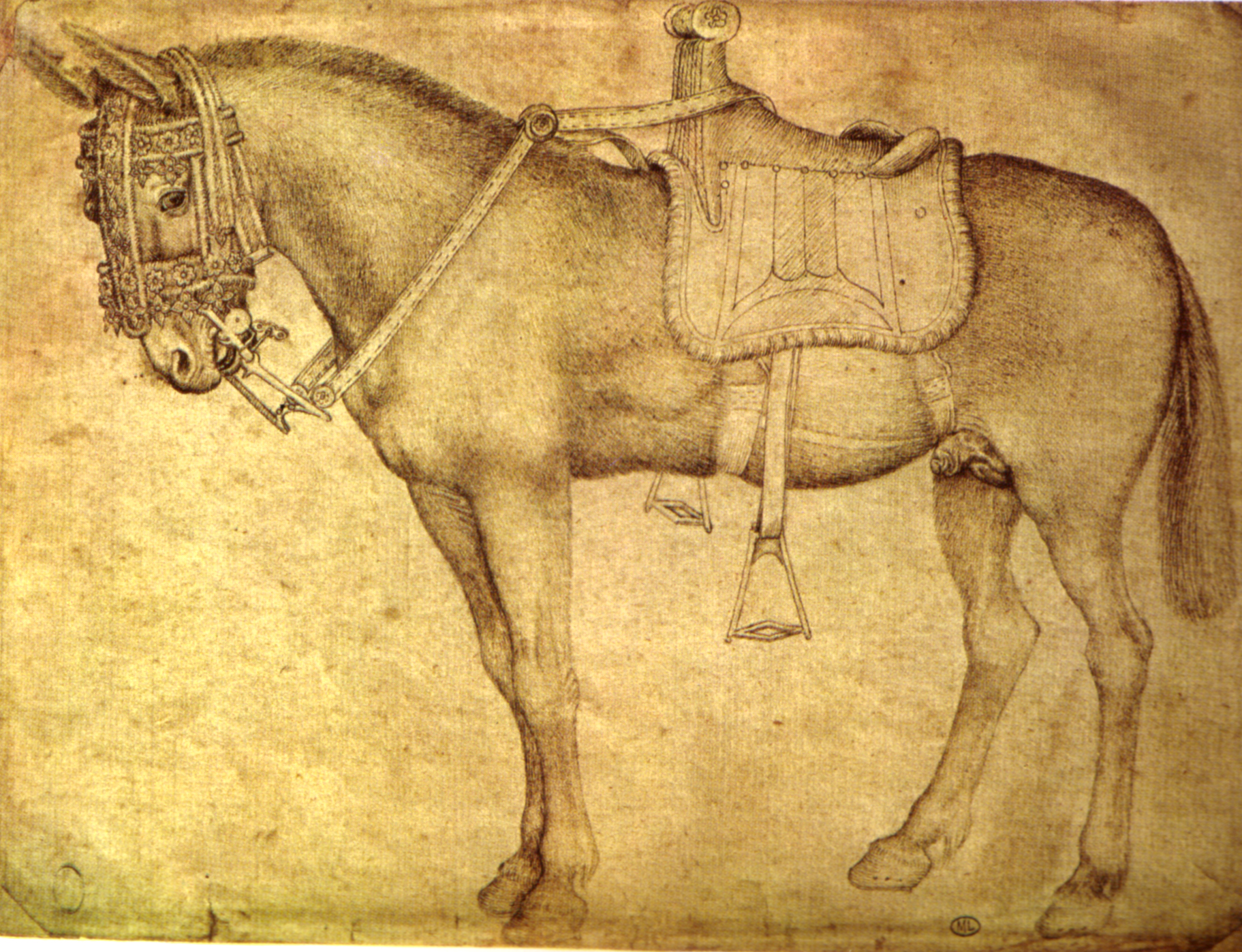
A pen and ink drawing from the Codex Vallardi (folio 2325)

The Codex Vallardi is a collection of drawings by Antonio Pisanello, acquired for the Cabinet des Dessins of the Louvre for 35,000 gold francs from the Milanese print dealer and antiquarian Giuseppe Vallardi (1784-1861) in March 1856. Consisting of 378 folios, its purchase was negotiated by Frédéric Reiset, who also reinstated its correct attribution, replacing a misattribution to Leonardo da Vinci.
