= Agostino Busti =

Italian sculptor

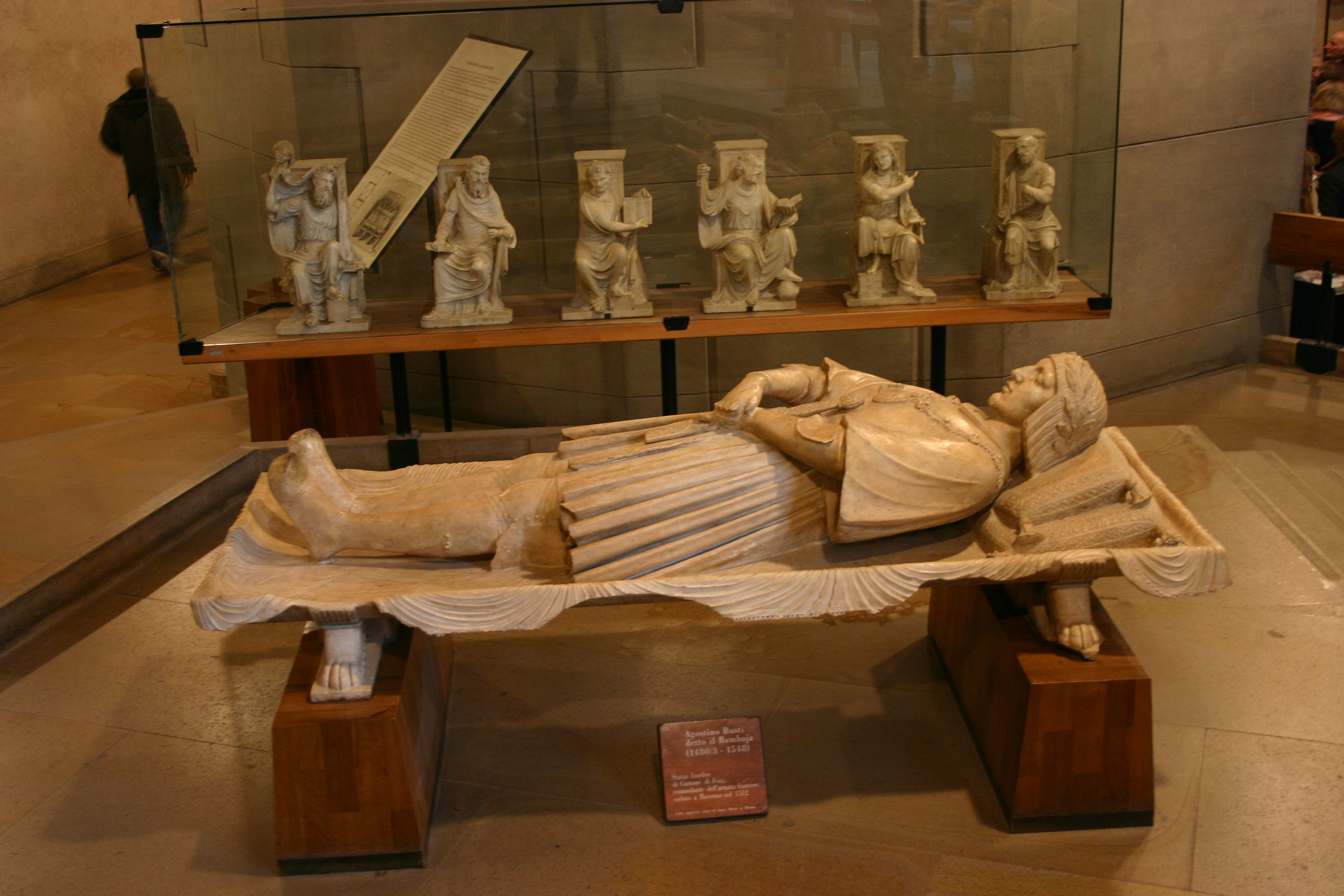
Busti's funerary monument to Gaston de Foix, in the Museo d'arte antica, Sforza Castle, Milan, Italy.

Agostino Busti (or Bambaia) (c. 1483 – 11 June 1548) was an Italian Renaissance sculptor.

Busti was born in Busto Arsizio in northern Italy. Busti probably began his training with the sculptor and architect Benedetto Briosco. He and his brother's applications in 1512 for sculptural work at the workshop of the Milan Cathedral are the first biographical documents available. Vasari considered him a pupil of the painter and architect Bernardino Zenale, stressing the pictorial quality of his work.

It is difficult to establish attribution and a timeline for Bambaia's output. The earliest work usually attributed to him is a marble monument in 1513 for the funeral of the Milanese poet and humanist Lancino Curzio. It was modeled on a funeral stele, and included allegorical and mythological figures but no religious reference. In his early years, his most demanding commission was probably the monument to the French general Gaston de Foix, which had been requested by the French rulers of Milan. Begun no later than 1517, the project was never completed due to the political difficulties of the city's rulers, who abandoned Milan in 1522.

Busti worked on a number of tombs and monuments in his life including those of Gian Marco, Zenone Birago, Mercurio Bua, Giovanni Antonio Bellotti, Marino Caracciolo, Canon Giovanni Vimercati, and Saint Evasius.

He died in Milan in 1548.
