= Casa dei Grifi (Milano) =

Palazzo Casa dei Grifi (Milano)
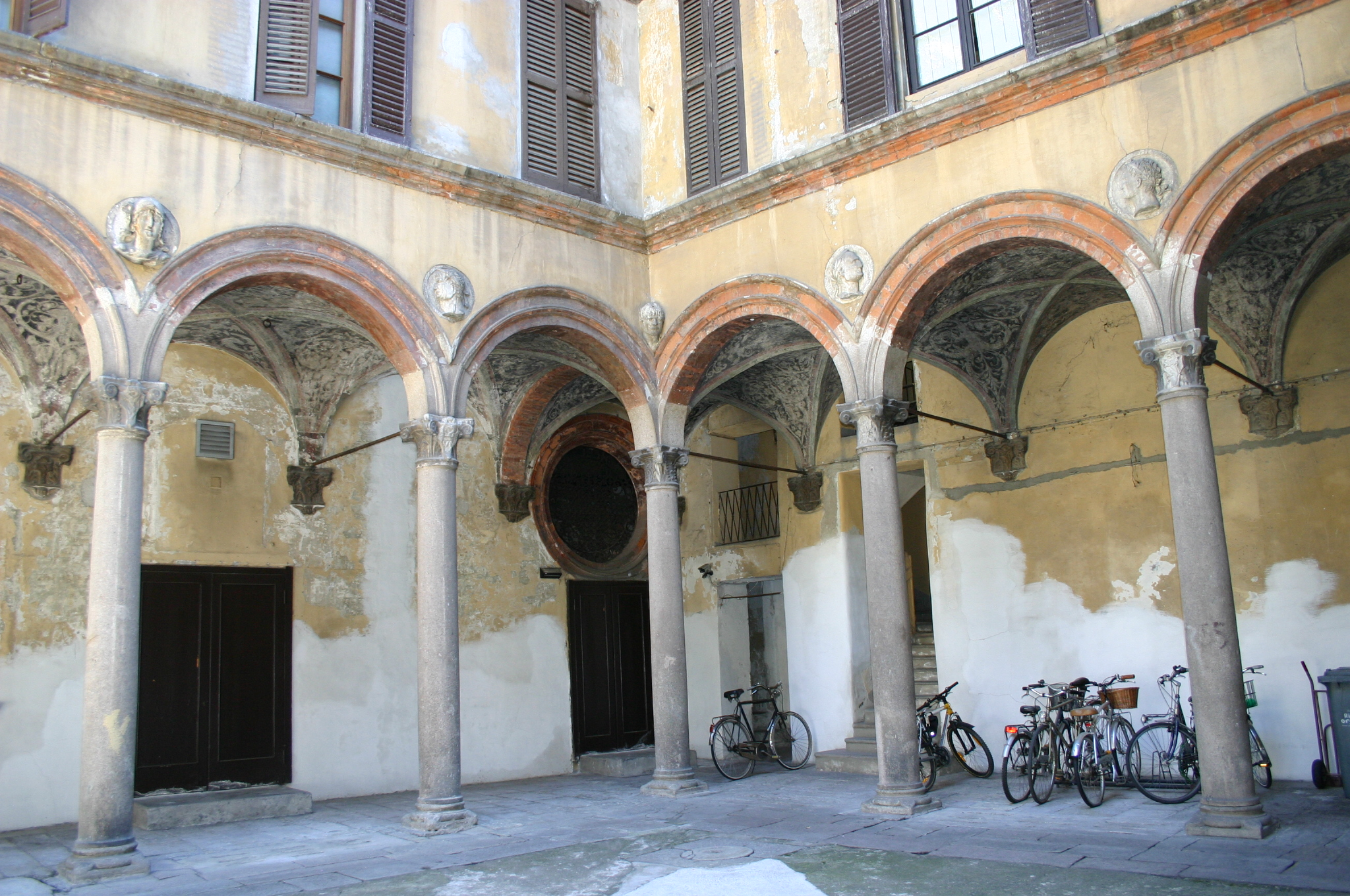
- Main courtyard
- Interactive map of the Palazzo Casa dei Grifi (Milano) area

General information
- Status: In use
- Type: Palace
- Architectural style: Renaissance architecture
- Location: Milan, Italy, 5, Via Valpetrosa
- Coordinates: 45.462114°N 9.185497°E
- Construction started: XVth century

Design and construction
- Architect: Donato Bramante

The Casa dei Grifi is a historic building in Milan, located in Via Valpetrosa 5.

== History ==
The palace was the home of the Grifi family, also known as Griffi or Grifo, contractors for the collection of gabelle under the Sforza. The family, of merchant origins, had among its exponents influential intellectuals of the Sforza court. Particular mention should be made of Leonardo, archbishop of Benevento and author of poems, and his brother Ambrogio, archiater at the court of Ludovico il Moro, to whom a chapel in San Pietro in Gessate is dedicated.

Construction of the palazzo was begun at the end of the 15th century and completed in the following century, in post-Bramantesque forms. Among the building's many vicissitudes, in the 19th century it was the site of the Albergo Gran Parigi, terminus of the stagecoach (carriage) to Pavia. Despite this, it has preserved one of the best-preserved Renaissance-style courtyards in Milan.

== Description ==
The rectangular courtyard, which on the upper floors has been transformed with the characteristic Milanese railing walkways, still has the Bramante-style portico on the ground floor. The portico, on three sides, consists of arches (architecture) in terracotta, supported by granite columns with composite capitals. The ribbed vaults are covered with a monochrome decoration on a blue background, with grotesques scratched in. The coat of arms of the house with the gryphon rampant is repeated on the limestone capitals within horse head shields. The decoration is completed by stone roundels included between the arches, depicting profiles of emperors and personages of antiquity, and by the unusual full-round heads inserted in the corners. The decoration is attributed to Benedetto Briosco, as is the tomb of Ambrogio Grifi housed in San Pietro in Gessate.

== Image Gallery ==
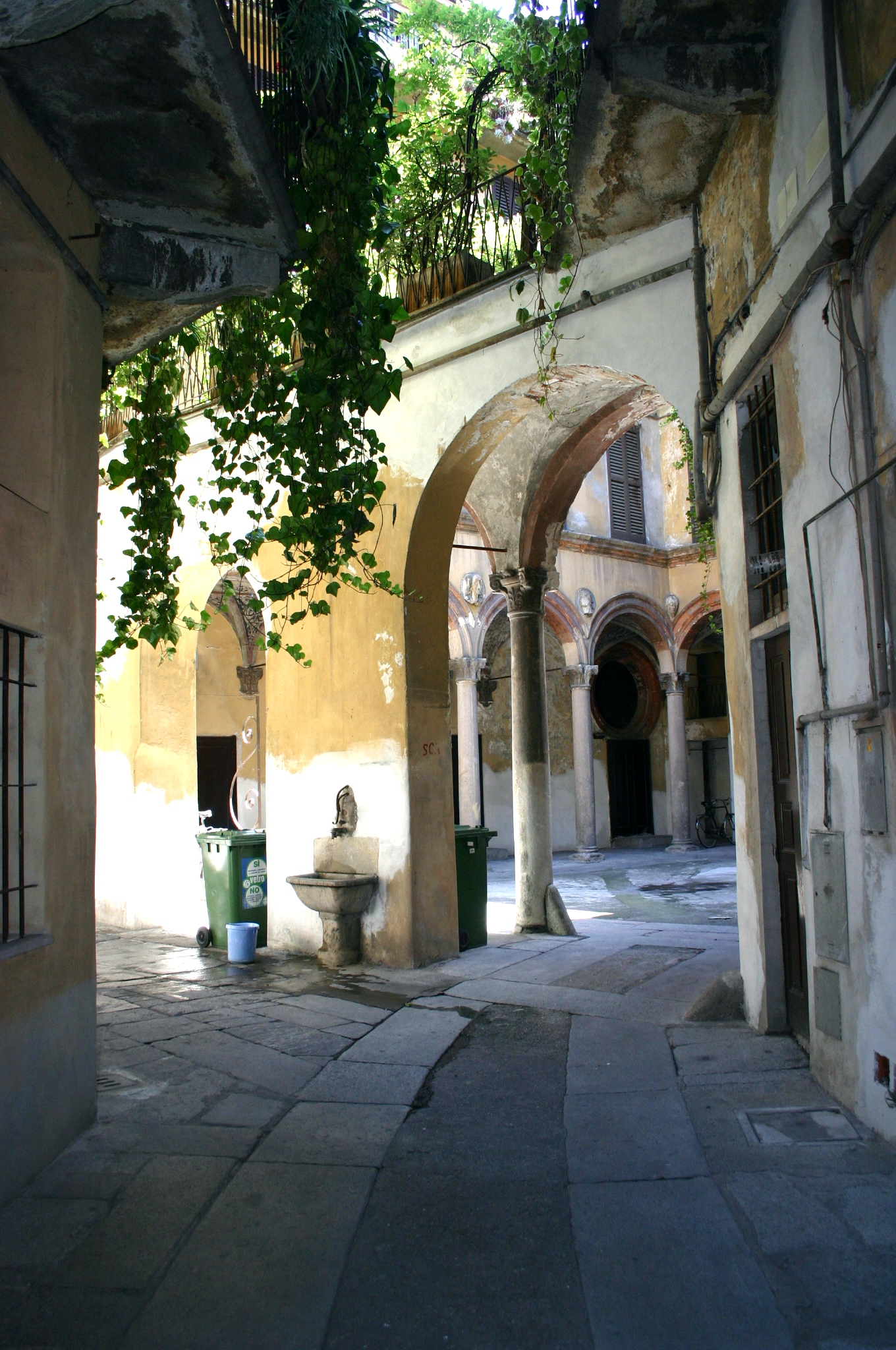
Entrance to courtyard

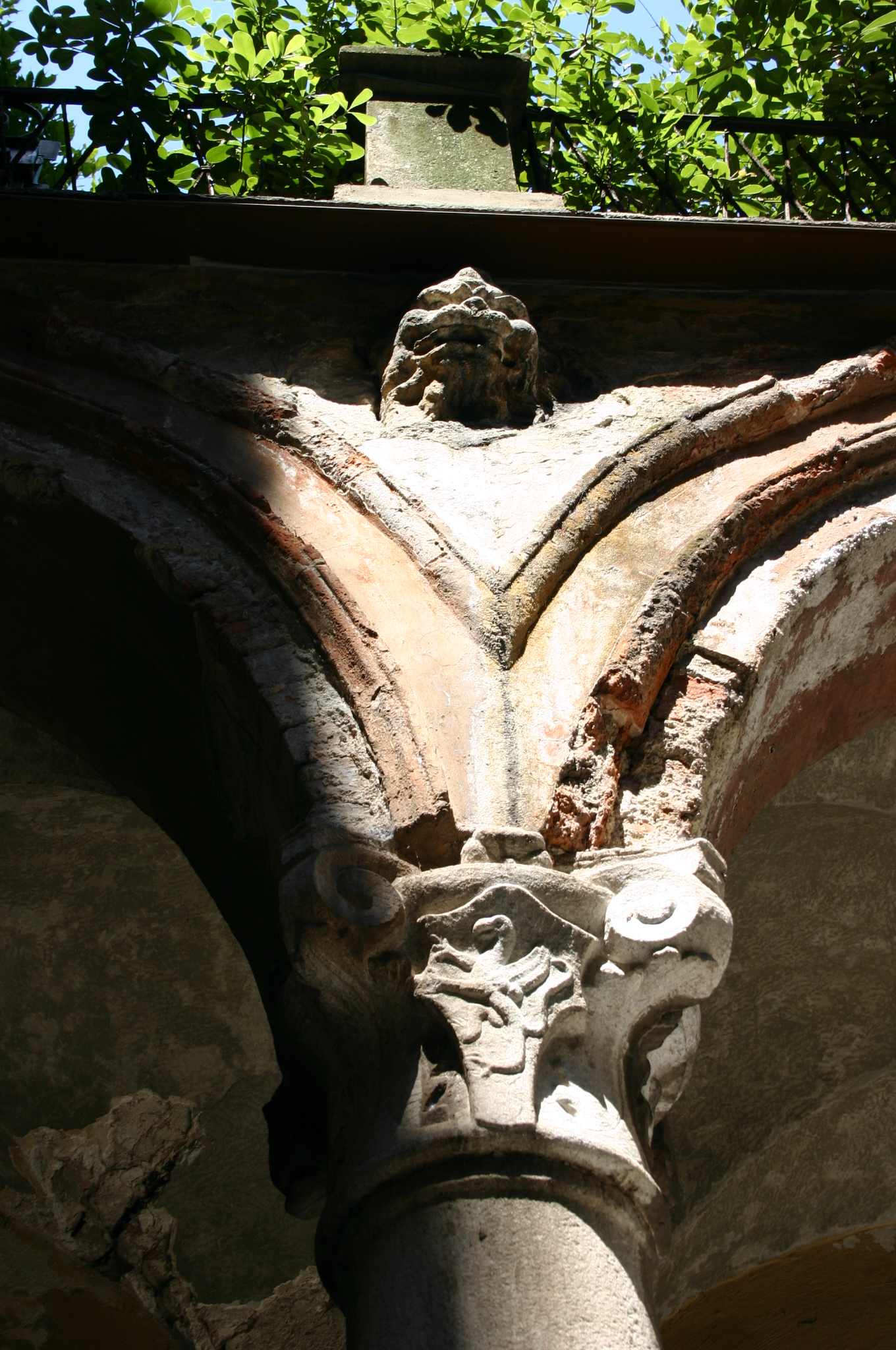
Chapel with the family crest

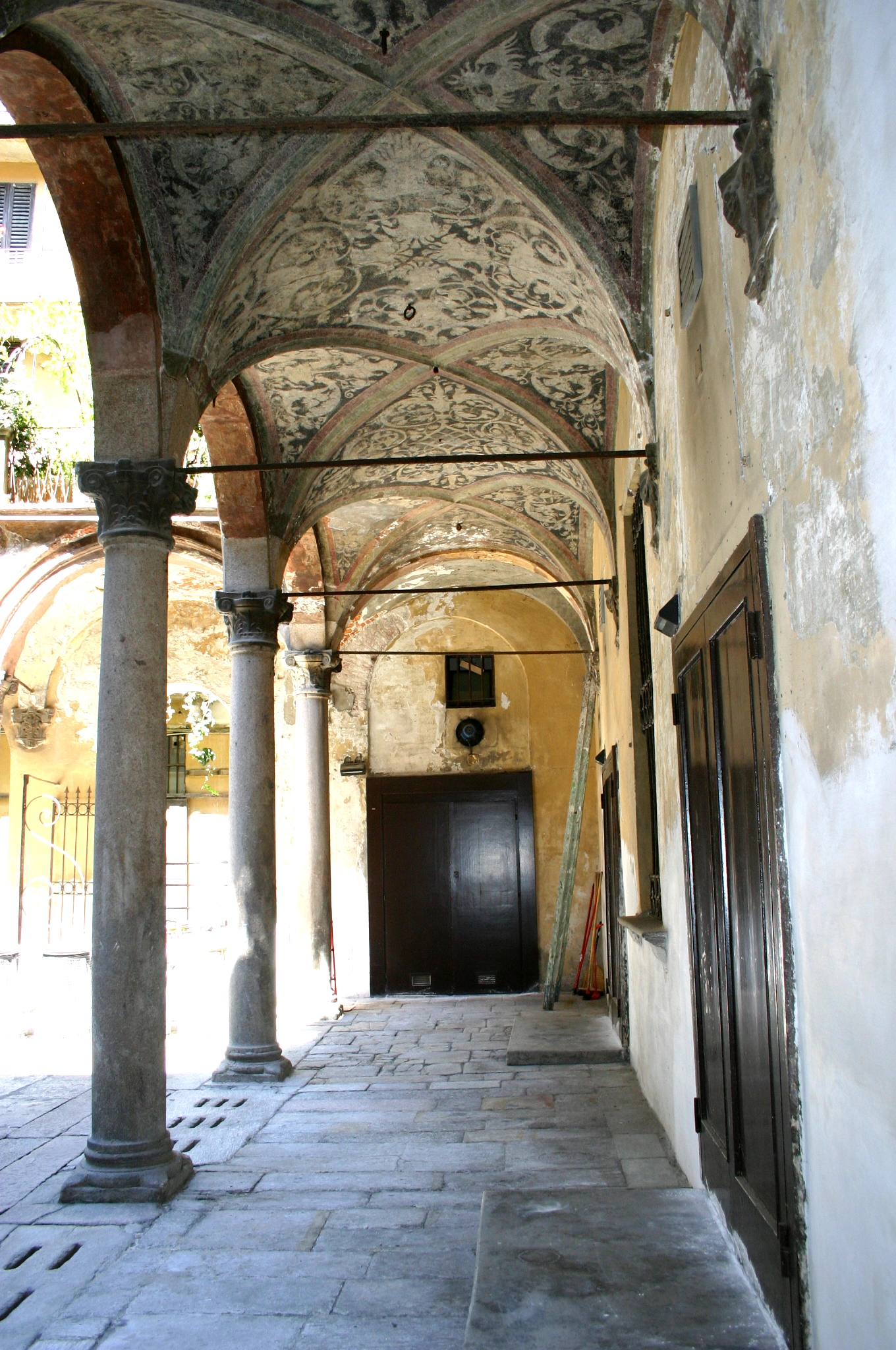
The frescoed vaults

== See also ==
- Palazzo Dal Verme

== Bibliography ==
=== Italian sources ===
- Guida d'Italia, Milano, Edizioni Touring Club Italiano, Milano 2005.
- M.C. Passoni, J. Stoppa, Il tardogotico e il rinascimento, in "Itinerari di Milano e provincia", Provincia di Milano, MIlano, 2000
- scheda architettonica del SIRBeC - Sistema Informativo dei Beni Culturali della Regione Lombardia, Milano, 2011.
