= Casa Fontana-Silvestri =

Renaissance building in Milan, Italy

Coordinates: 45°28′5.48″N 9°11′55.9″E

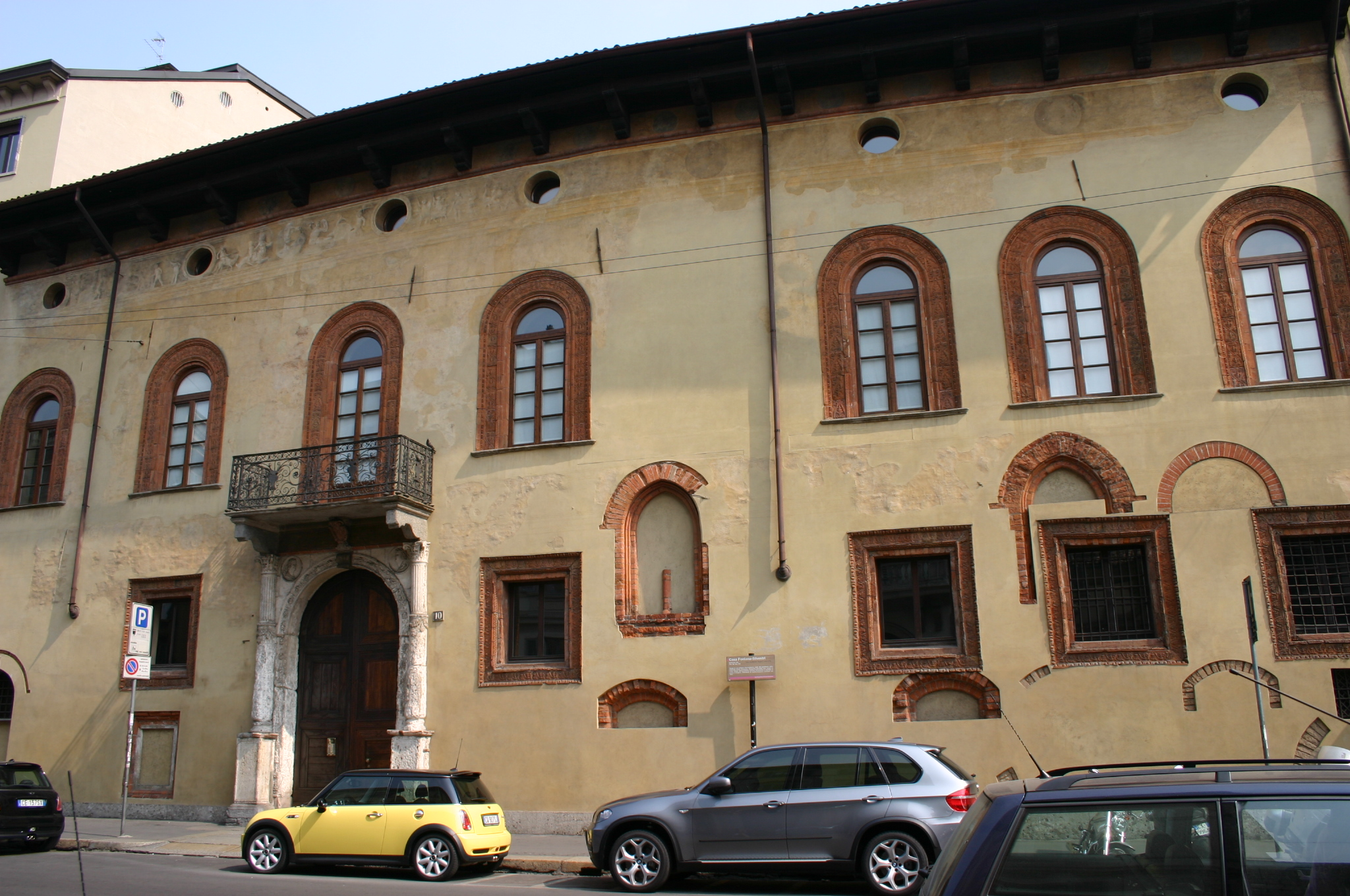
Casa Fontana-Silvestri

Casa Fontana-Silvestri is one of the few Renaissance buildings surviving in Milan, Italy. The main structure dates back to the 12th century, but its current form is due to a thorough modification that were made at the end of the 14th century, in a style that mixes Renaissance and Gothic elements.

The facade was originally decorated with frescos that scholars credit to Bramante or Bramantino; most of these painting have disappeared, with just a few remnants now visible under the cornice. It has also been suggested that Bramante may have designed the cotto decorations, also on the facade.

== See also ==
- Casa dei Grifi (Milano)
