= Giovanni Antonio Cangiasi =

Italian composer

Giovanni Antonio Cangiasi (second half sixteenth century – 1614 or shortly after) was an Italian composer.

== Biography and career ==
Born in Milan, Cangiasi was a Franciscan friar. He was an organist at Vercelli cathedral from 1588 to 1590 at least, then, in 1602, at San Francesco in Milan. In 1607 and 1611 he was at the Franciscan abbey in Locarno. In 1614 he become organist at the Chiesa maggiore in Castelnuovo Scrivia. He died presumably in 1614 or shortly after.

== Works ==
- Sacrae cantiones
- Psalmodia
- Melodia sacra
- Li ariosi Magnificat a 8 voci, Milan 1590 (lost)
- Il secondo libro delle canzonette a tre voci, Milan 1602
- Scherzi forastieri per suonare a quattro voci, Milan 1614
