= Bartolomeo di Cassino =

Italian painter

Bartolomeo di Cassino (late 16th century) was an Italian painter active in the Mannerist period. He was born in Milan. He was a pupil of Vincenzo Civerchio.
