= Bernardino Butinone =

Italian painter

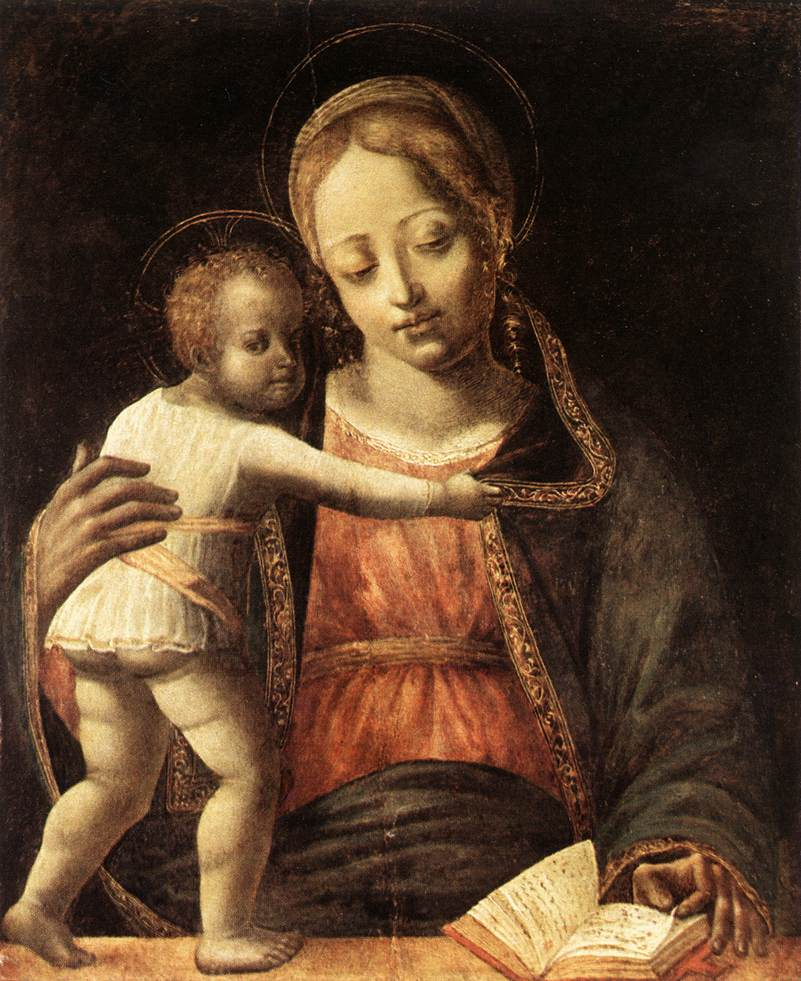
- Madonna with Child, 1490, Pinacoteca di Brera, Milan.
- Born: 1435 or 1436; Treviglio, Lombardy
- Died: 1507 or 1508
- Movement: Renaissance

Bernardino Butinone (1435 or 1436 – c. 1507 or 1508) was an Italian painter of the Renaissance, active mainly around Milan.

== Biography ==
Born in Treviglio, Lombardy, Butinone was the son of Jacopo da Treviglio, and also known as Bernardo da Treviglio.

A pupil of Vincenzo Foppa, he was tutor of Bramantino and collaborated with Bernardo Zenale. Others claimed he trained with Vincenzo Civerchio, with whom he worked in Milan. From 1491 to 1493 they executed the vault of the Grifi Chapel in San Pietro in Gessate in Milan. His masterwork is the polyptych of San Martino in Treviglio, which was commissioned in 1485.

Butinone's most appealing works are a series of small panels he painted depicting the life of Christ, which are now dispersed in various collections. These include the Adoration of the Shepherds (National Gallery, London), Adoration of the Magi (Brooklyn Museum of Art), Massacre of the Innocents (Detroit Institute of Arts), Flight into Egypt and Deposition (Art Institute of Chicago), Christ among the Doctors (National Gallery of Scotland, Edinburgh), and Supper at Bethany (Blanton Museum of Art, University of Texas, Austin).

He also frescoed the pilasters of Santa Maria delle Grazie of Milan.

== Sources ==
- Farquhar, Maria (1855). Ralph Nicholson Wornum (ed.). Biographical catalogue of the principal Italian painters. London: Woodfall & Kinder. p. 38.
