= Vincenzo Civerchio =

Italian painter

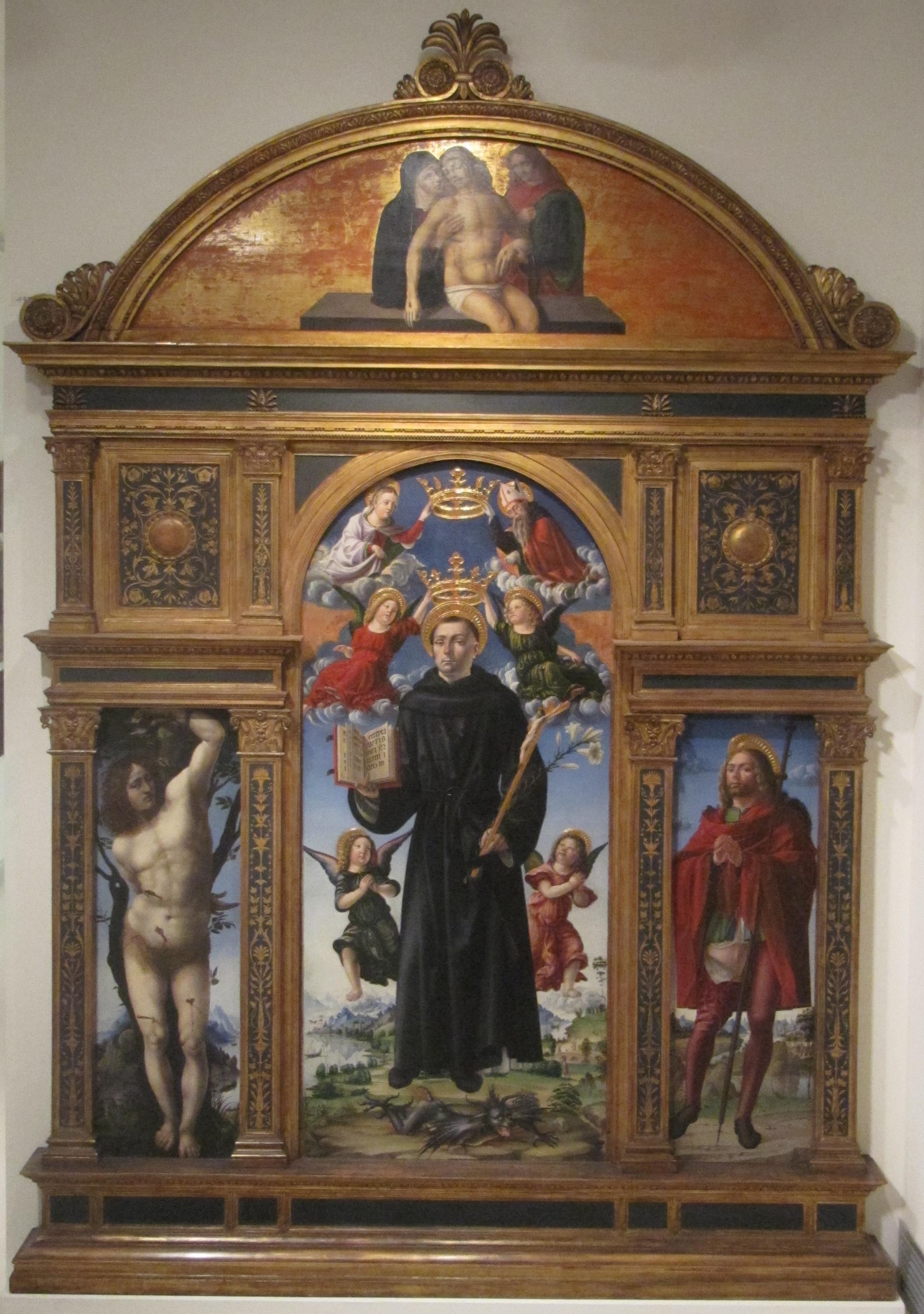
Altarpiece of St. Nicholas of Tolentino, Pinacoteca Tosio Martinengo, 1495

Vincenzo Civerchio or Civercio (c. 1470 – c. 1544) was an Italian painter of the Renaissance, born at Crema, and active also in Brescia, where there are some of his alter-pieces. One of his works is at the National Gallery of Art, Washington D.C., others in the Pinacoteca di Brera, Milan, Italy. He is said to be an imitator of Bernardino Butinone, Bernardino Zenale, and influenced by Vincenzo Foppa.

Luigi Donato of Como is said to have been a pupil.

== See also ==
- Bartolomeo di Cassino
