= Luigi Donato =

Italian painter

Luigi Donato (late 15th century – early 16th century) was an Italian painter, known for altarpieces, and active in and near Como.

== Biography ==
According to Luigi Lanzi, he was putatively a pupil of Vincenzo Civerchio (c. 1470 – c. 1544). Circa 1495, Donato painted a large polyptych, of which now remains the Ancona di Moltrasio.
