= San Pietro in Gessate =

Church in Milan

Coordinates: 45°27′47″N 9°12′05″E

Church of Saint Peter in Gessate (Chiesa di San Pietro in Gessate)
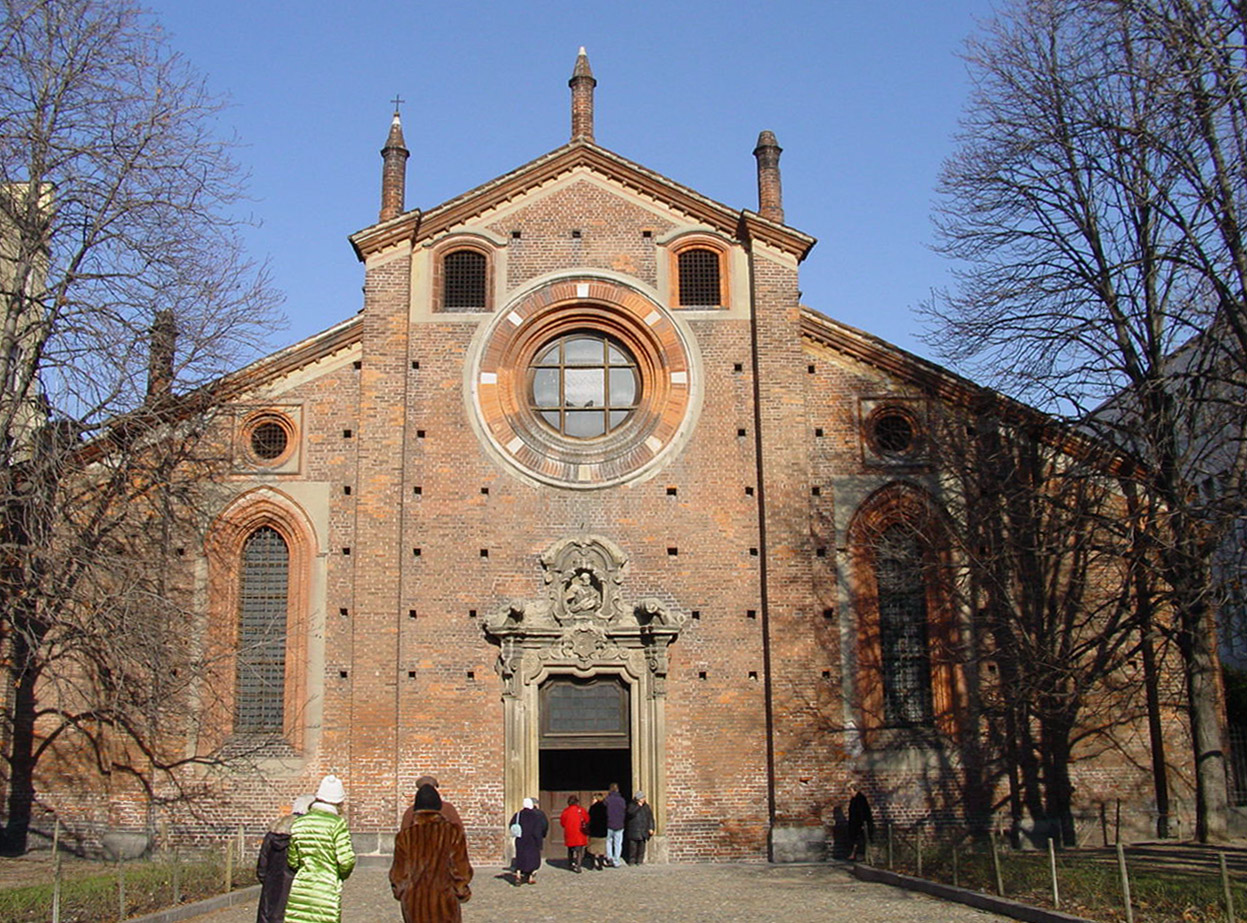
- Façade of the church.

Religion
- Affiliation: Roman Catholic
- Province: Milan
- Status: Active

Location
- Location: Milan, Italy
- Interactive map of Church of Saint Peter in Gessate (Chiesa di San Pietro in Gessate)

Architecture
- Architect: Guiniforte Solari?
- Type: Church
- Style: Gothic
- Groundbreaking: 15c

San Pietro in Gessate is a church in Milan, northern Italy. Built in the 15th century, it is a noteworthy example of Gothic architecture.

== Description ==
The architect was either Guiniforte Solari or his son Pietro Antonio. The church has a nave and two aisles, with square-plan, groin vaulted spans, flanked by two rows of chapels. Instead of the traditional Gothic piers, the naves are separated by Corinthian columns in granite, the sole indication in the church of the contemporary humanist revolution started in Florence by Brunelleschi and others.

San Pietro in Gessate is home to a series of paintings of the Renaissance in Lombardy. Artists who worked here include Giovanni Donato Montorfano, Bernardino Butinone and Bernardo Zenale. The latter responsible for the impressive Histories of St.Ambrose in the Grifi Chapel. The chapel has a notable tombstone statue of Ambrogio Grifi by Benedetto Briosco. In the early 16th century Vincenzo Foppa completed for this church his famous Deposition, which later acquired by the Museum of Berlin and lost during World War II. From 1514 is a fresco by Ambrogio Bergognone portraying the Funeral of St Martin.

In April 2024, Europa Nostra and the EIB Institute named San Pietro in Gessate as one of Europe’s 7 Most Endangered Heritage Sites for 2024. Citing poor maintenance and harsh environmental conditions, the groups expressed particular concern for the church's deteriorating frescoes.
