= Bernardo Zenale =

Italian Renaissance artist

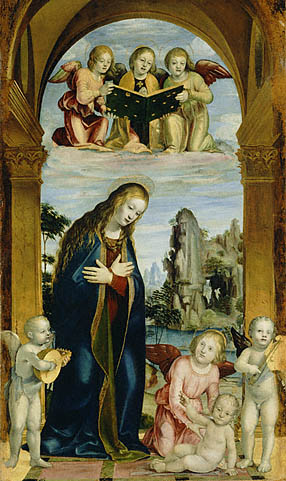
Bernardo Zenale, Adoration of the Child, Getty Museum

Bernardo (or Bernardino) Zenale (c. 1460 – 1526) was an Italian painter and architect.

== Biography ==
Zenale was born in Treviglio, Lombardy, where in 1485 he finished the great polyptych for the church of St. Martin, together with his fellow Bernardino Butinone. Like Butinone, he is said to have trained with Vincenzo Civerchio. Later he collaborated to the decoration of the Certosa di Pavia. Subsequently, he was engaged by Ludovico Sforza, Duke of Milan, to paint a room in the Castello Sforzesco of that city. Also with Butinone, he frescoed the Grifi Chapel in the church of San Pietro in Gessate.

After circa 1500, Zenale seemed to abandon the Ferrarese-expressionist style of Butinone, a strong influence from Leonardo da Vinci starting to appear in his works. This is manifest in the polyptych that he painted for the Confraternity of the Immaculate Conception of Cantù (1502). He was influenced also by Bernardino Luini's style: works like the Pala Busti and the large Annunciation (both in the Pinacoteca di Brera) have indeed raised disputes about the attribution to Luini or Zenale.

Zenale worked also in Brescia (the noteworthy Deposition in the church of St. John the Evangelist). In 1510 he painted a Madonna with Child between St. Ambrose and St. Jerome, for the church of St. Francis in Milan, now in Denver. In 1522 he replaced Giovanni Antonio Amadeo in the direction of works of the Duomo di Milano.

== Sources ==
- Zenale e Leonardo. Tradizione e rinnovamento della pittura lombarda. Milan. 1983.
- Buganza, S. (1998). M. Gregori (ed.). Bernardo Zenale, in Pittura a Milano. Rinascimento e Manierismo. Milan. pp. 203–204.

== See also ==
- Church of San Francesco Grande
