= Benedetto Briosco =

Italian Renaissance sculptor and architect

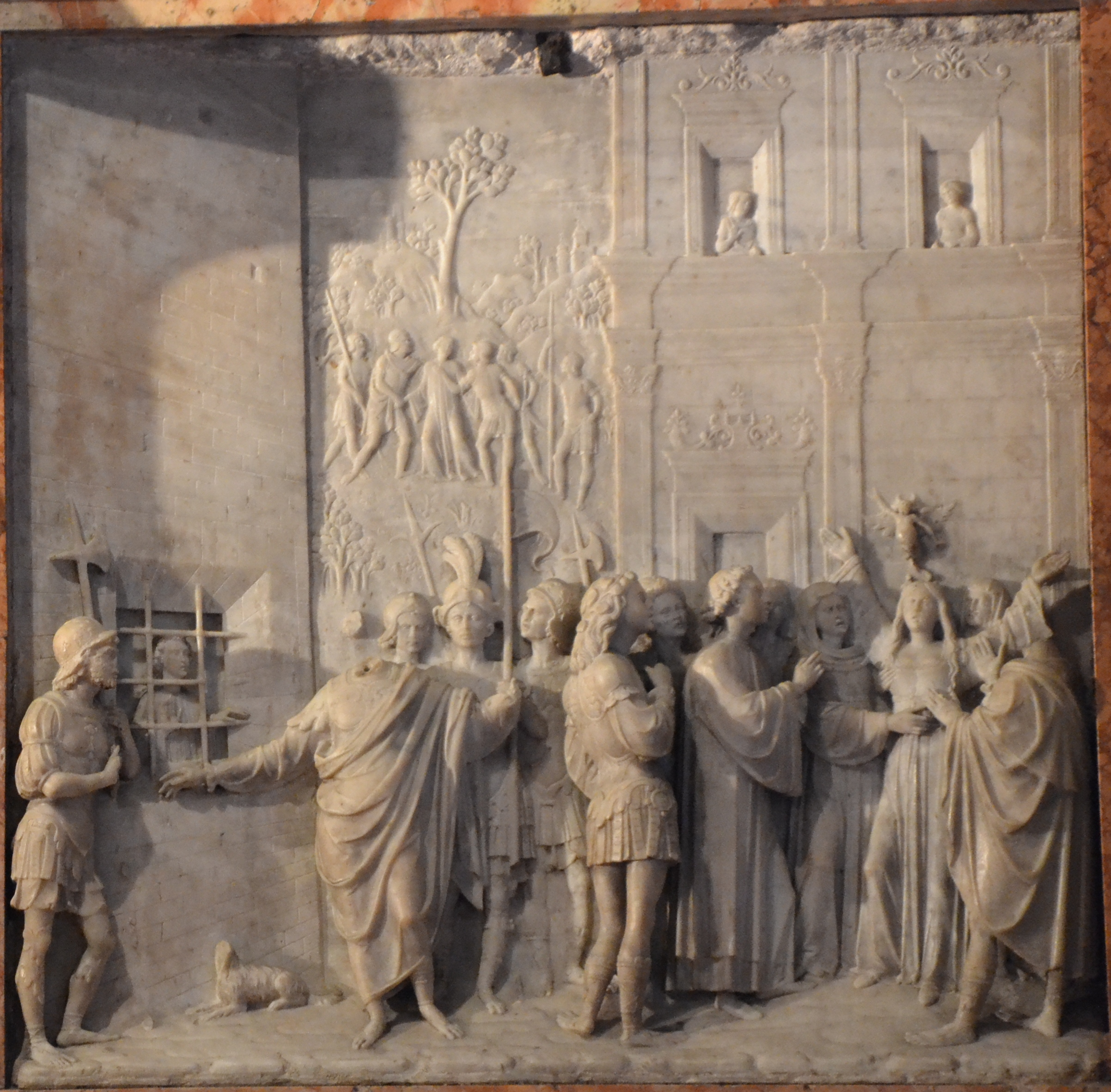
Arca of Saints Marcellinus and Peter, Cremona Cathedral.

Benedetto Briosco (c.1460–c.1517) was an Italian Renaissance sculptor and architect, active in Lombardy.

Briosco was born in Pavia, and is thought to have apprenticed in Milan. His sepulchre monument of Ambrogio Grifi (1489) in the church of San Pietro in Gessate in Milan is his first documented work. The statue is characterized by a crude realism. Also from his early years in Milan, in which he collaborated with Francesco Cazzaniga, are the Brivio Monument in the Basilica of Sant'Eustorgio (1489) and the Della Torre Monument in Santa Maria delle Grazie (1483–1484).

From around 1492 he was involved in the sculptural program of the Certosa di Pavia. He collaborated on the decoration of the façade with Giovanni Antonio Amadeo, and after the death of Amadeo he took over as sole director of the design and sculpting of the main portal (1501–1507). He also worked on the tomb of Gian Galeazzo Visconti (under Giovanni Cristoforo Romano). In 1508-13 he worked in the Cathedral of Cremona (sculpting the Urn of Saints Peter and Marcellinus). Traveling from Lombardy to Piedmont, in the church of San Giovanni in Saluzzo he built the tomb of Ludovico II of Saluzzo.

He sculpted the noteworthy statue of "St. Anne" for the Duomo of Milan (1492), now in the cathedral's museum. From 1495 is the Longhignana monument once in the church of San Pietro in Gessate, and now in the Palazzo Borromeo on the Isola Bella in Lake Maggiore.

The portal of the Pavia Charterhouse
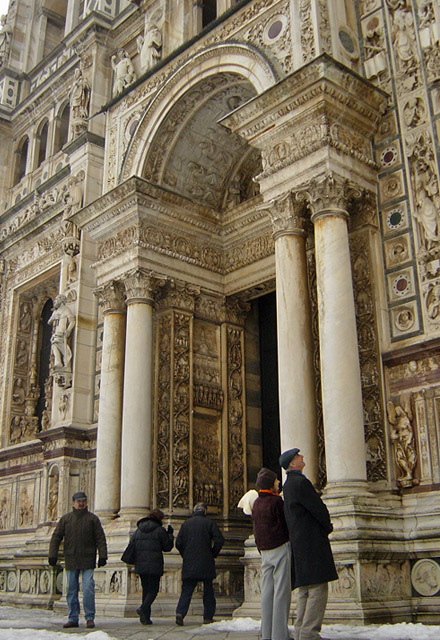
Overall view

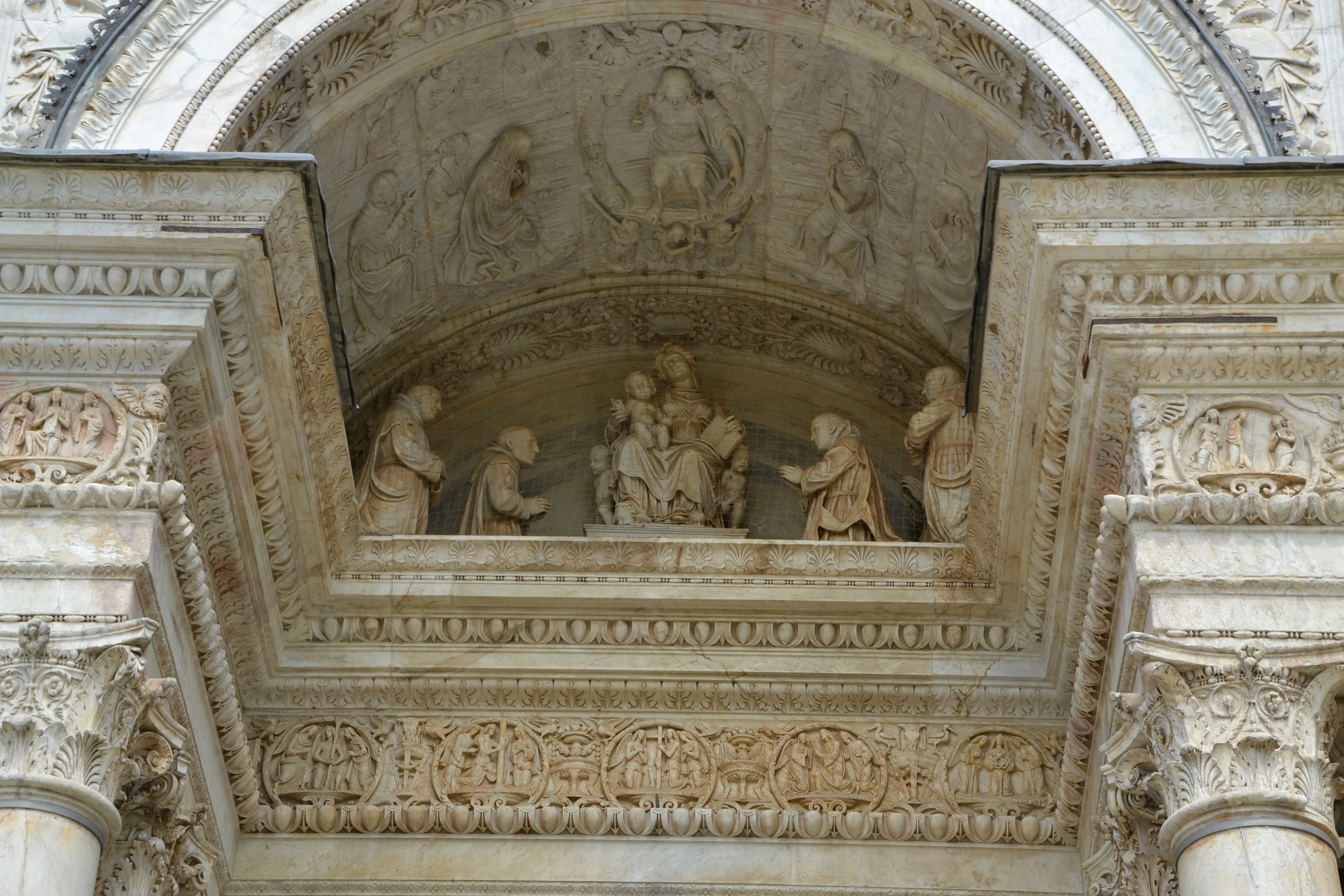
Tympanum with two couples of Carthusians paying homage to the Virgin and Child.

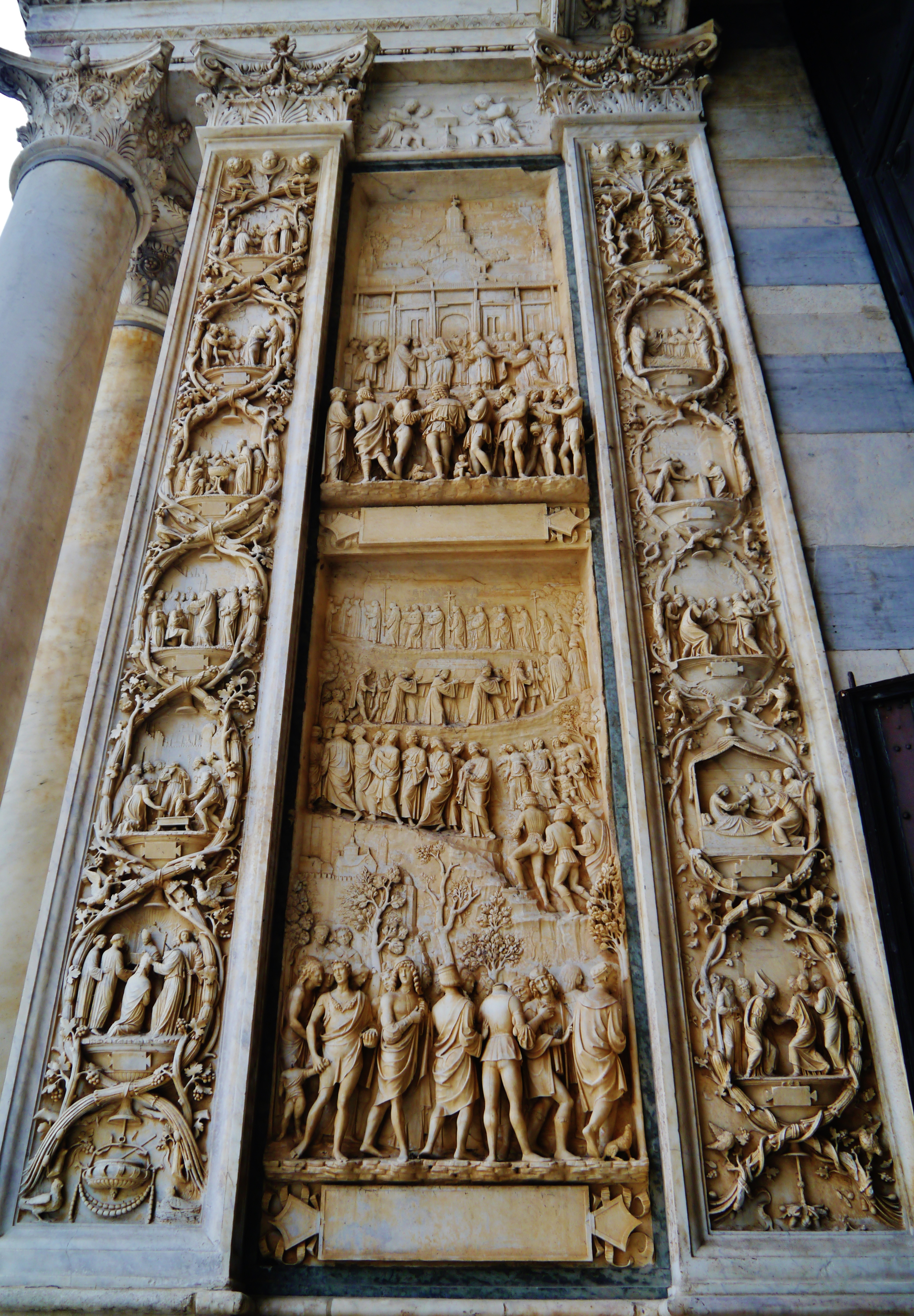
Left side.

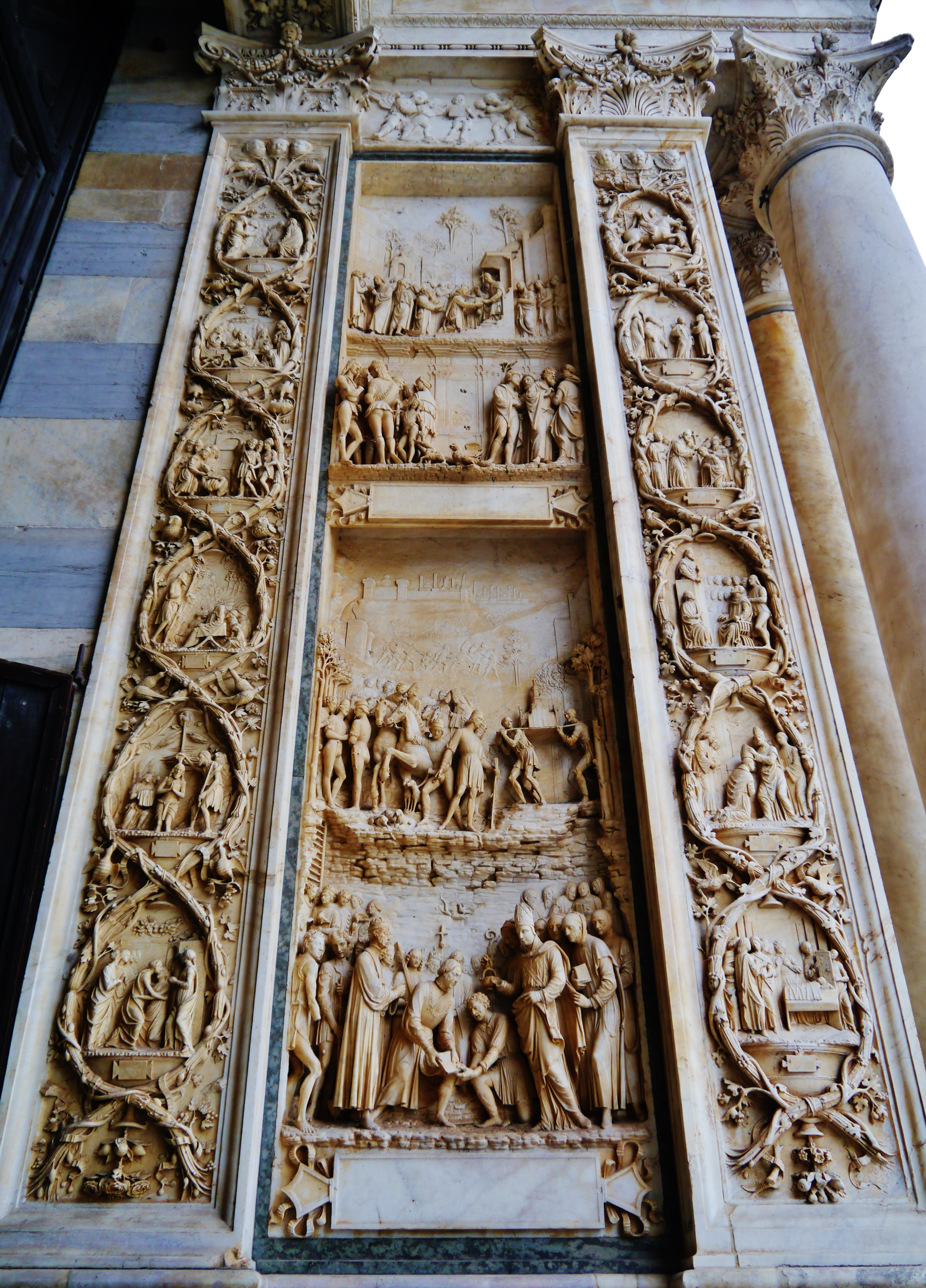
Right side.

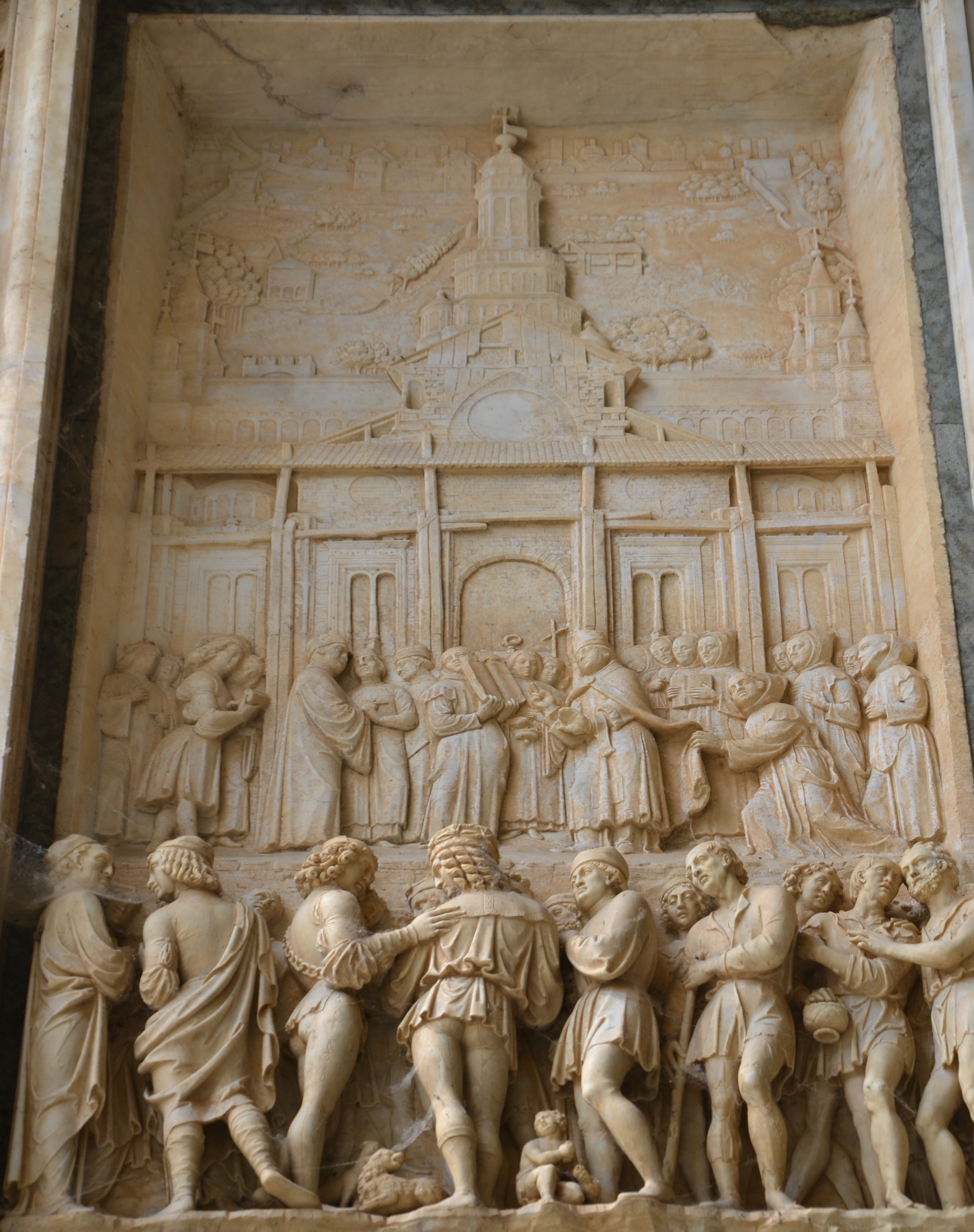
Charterhouse consecration ceremony (upper left side).

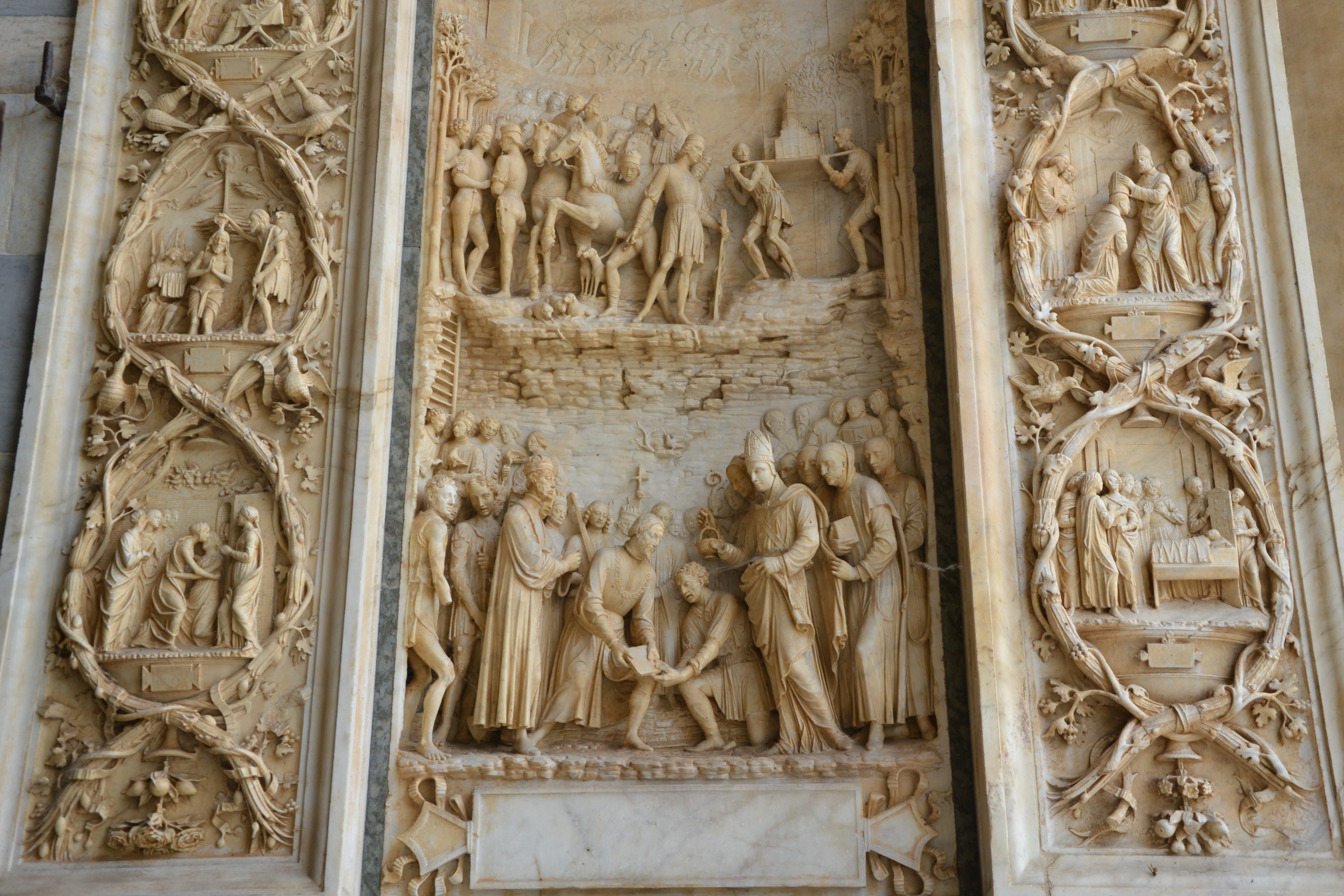
Ceremony of laying the foundation stone of the Charterhouse (lower right side).

== Sources ==
- Bossaglia, Rossana (1968). "La scultura". In M. G. Albertini Ottolenghi; R. Bossaglia; F. R. Pesenti (eds.). La Certosa di Pavia. Milan. pp. 41–80.
- Zani, Vito (1998). "L'altare di Santa Caterina nel Duomo di Milano e la maturità di Benedetto Briosco". Nuovi studi (5): 39–64.
- Ticozzi, Stefano (1830). Dizionario degli architetti, scultori, pittori, intagliatori in rame ed in pietra, coniatori di medaglie, musaicisti, niellatori, intarsiatori d'ogni etá e d'ogni nazione' (Volume 1). Milan: Gaetano Schiepatti. p. 221.
