= Costantino =

Costantino is both a masculine Italian given name and an Italian surname. Notable people with the name include:

== People with the given name ==
- Costantino Affer (1906–1987), Italian medallist
- Costantino Barbella (1853–1925), Italian sculptor
- Costantino Bresciani Turroni (1882–1963), Italian economist and statistician
- Costantino de Castro, (fl. 1073) Sardinian Roman Catholic bishop
- Costantino Catena (born 1969), Italian classical pianist
- Costantino Cedini (1741–1811), Italian painter
- Costantino Corti, 19th-century Italian sculptor
- Costantino D'Orazio (born 1974), Italian art critic and curator
- Costantino Fiaschetti, 18th-century Italian architect
- Costantino De Giacomo, Italian physician
- Costantino Lazzari (1857–1927), Italian politician
- Costantino Nigra (1828–1907), Italian diplomat
- Costantino Nivola (1911–1988), Italian sculptor
- Costantino Pasqualotto (1681–1755), Italian painter
- Costantino Patrizi Naro (1798–1876), Italian cardinal
- Costantino Rocca (born 1956), Italian golfer
- Costantino Sala (1913–?), Italian footballer
- Costantino Sereno (1829–1893), Italian painter
- Costantino de' Servi (1554–1522), Italian painter, engineer, and architect

== People with the surname ==
- Damian Costantino (born c. 1978), American baseball player
- Gregory Costantino (born 1960), American politician
- Jean Costantino (born 1944), French rugby union player
- Marco Costantino (born 1991), Italian footballer
- Mark Americus Costantino (1920–1990), American judge
- Normando Costantino (born 1952), Argentine Air Force brigadier
- Raffaele Costantino (1907–1991), Italian footballer
- Romola Costantino (1930–1988), Australian pianist
- Rosario Costantino (footballer, born 1997), Italian football player
- Sharon Costantino (born 1975), Maltese footballer
- Steven M. Costantino (born 1957), American politician
- Tommaso Costantino (1885–1950), Italian fencer

== See also ==
- Costantino Lake, a lake in Calabria, Italy
- Constantine (disambiguation)
- San Costantino (disambiguation)
