= Altarpiece in the Chapel of the Immaculate Conception =

Altarpiece by Giacomo del Maino

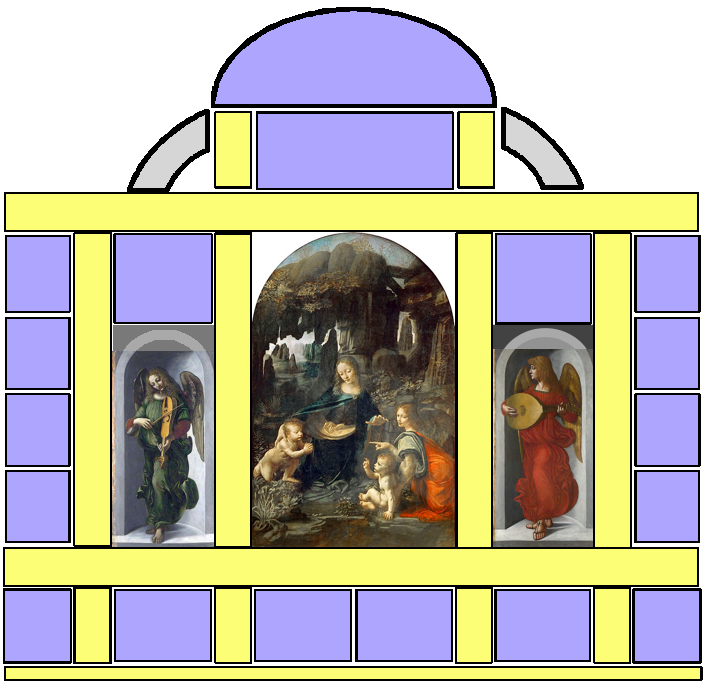
- Proposal for reconstruction of the altarpiece
- Artists: Giacomo del Maino (structure); Evangelista de Predis (painting and gilding of the structure); Leonardo da Vinci and Giovanni Ambrogio (creation of the painted panels)
- Completion date: 1480 or 1482
- Condition: Altarpiece dismantled in 1806
- Location: Milan

The altarpiece in the Chapel of the Immaculate Conception in the Church of San Francesco Grande (Italian: Chiesa di San Francesco Grande, destroyed 1806), Milan, was an altarpiece built between 1480 and 1482, decorated between 1483 and 1508, and dismantled in the 1780s.

Dedicated to the Immaculate Conception, it was displayed throughout its life in the chapel of the Church of San Francesco Grande.

Built by woodcarver Giacomo del Maino, it is most famous for featuring Leonardo da Vinci's painting the Virgin of the Rocks, now in London's National Gallery. It also includes two side panels, the Angel musicians, painted by Francesco Napoletano and Giovanni Ambrogio de Predis. The gilding and painting of its structure and sculpted parts were entrusted to the latter's brother, Evangelista.

Although Leonardo's painting is famous, its appearance is still the subject of debate among art historians, especially as it may have undergone changes over the centuries as it was moved around the church, restored and pieces removed or sold.

== Subject ==
The theme of the altarpiece is the Immaculate Conception.

Official Catholic dogma states that Mary, receiving in anticipation the fruits of the resurrection of her son Jesus, was conceived free of original sin: she was not corrupted by the initial fault that has since given every human being a tendency to commit evil. At the time of the altarpiece's creation, this dogma was still recent and controversial: it had only been accepted by the Catholic Church since 1470, and was so hotly debated that the Papacy did not officially proclaim it until 1854.

== History ==
=== Sponsorship ===
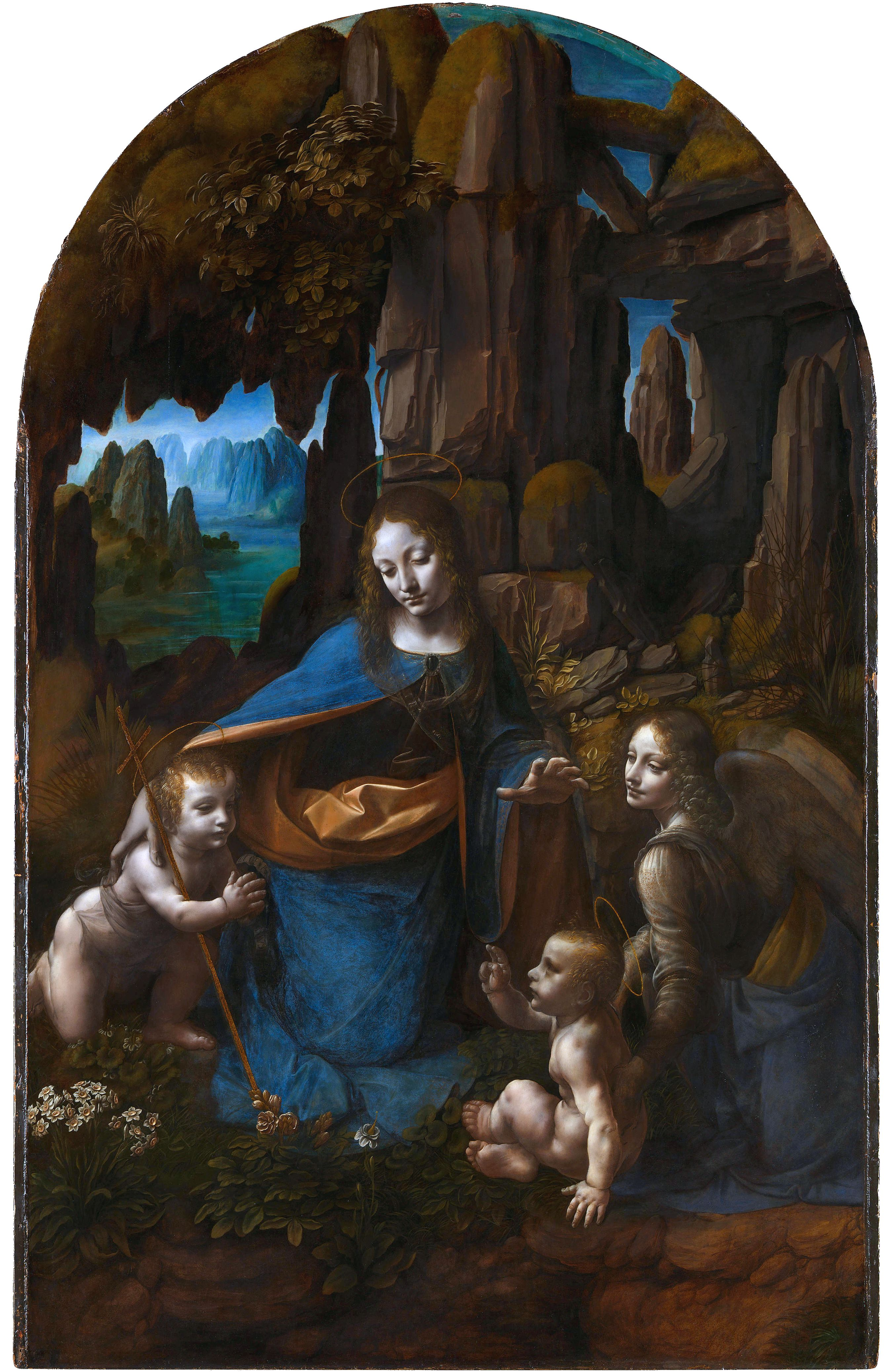
The Virgin of the Rocks by Leonardo da Vinci at the National Gallery, London

The work's patron is clearly identified: the Immaculate Conception Brotherhood, a lay confraternity in Milan, attached to the church of San Francesco Maggiore (Italian: San Fransesco Grande).

The brotherhood is richly endowed, since its members belong to the local aristocracy. As its name suggests, the church was founded Francis of Assisi, in 1210, a member of the Franciscans. A few years before the altarpiece was created, a chapel dedicated to the Virgin Mary and in particular to the Immaculate Conception was erected within it. It was built on a plot of land close to the atrium, against the chapel of St. John the Evangelist, on the way to Via Santa Valeria and Via San Ambrogio. The altarpiece was obviously installed at the very end of this construction, after the frescos decorating the vault had been created. Finally, it was designed according to the project drawn up by Prior Giacomo and three other scholars of the brotherhood. The arbitrator chosen to judge its quality was Giovanni Antonio Amadeo.

=== Allocations ===
Art historians are unanimous in attributing the various parts of the altarpiece to the artists involved in its creation.

The structure is the work of woodcarver Giacomo del Maino (before 1469 - 1503 or 1505). He owned a woodcarving workshop, and is known to have carved elements in the choir of the Basilica of Sant'Ambrogio as early as 1469, in collaboration with Lorenzo da Origgio and Giacomo da Torre. Between 1491 and 1505, in the church of San Maurizio del Ponte, he created another altarpiece dedicated to the same dogma, albeit on a smaller scale.

Evangelis de Predis was responsible for the gilding and painting of the sculpted and bas-relief parts of the structure. The central panel is the London version of the Virgin of the Rocks, created by Leonardo da Vinci.

As for the panels of the Angel musicians, they were created between 1495 and 1499 by Giovanni Ambrogio de Predis and Francesco Napoletano, almost certainly under the supervision of Leonardo da Vinci.

=== Chronology of the altarpiece's creation ===
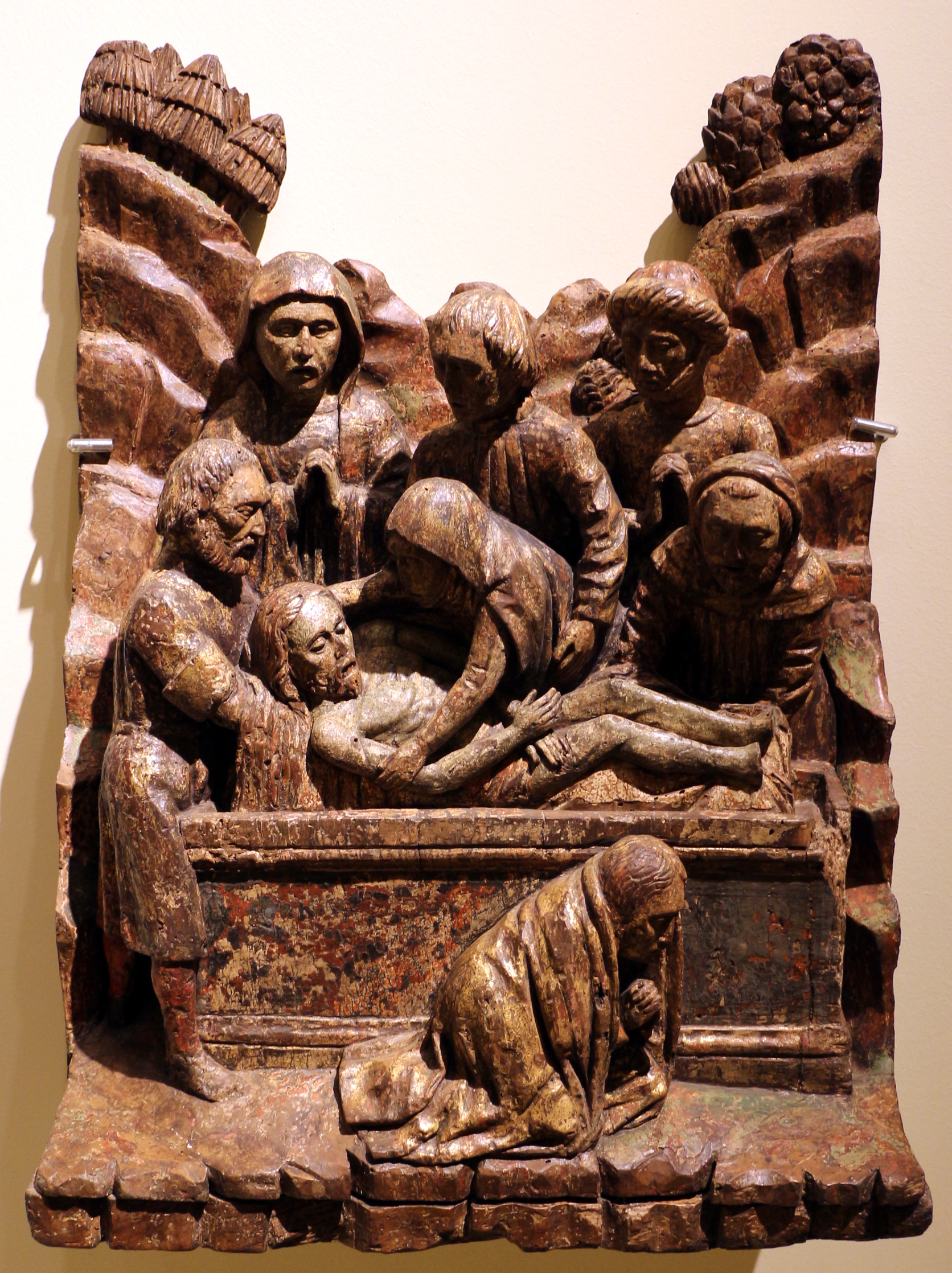
Giacomo del Maino, Entombment, between 1450 and 1475, at Castello Sforzesco, Milan

The Altarpiece of the Immaculate Conception was built on the basis of two successive commissions: the assembly of a wooden structure comprising sculptures and bas-relief; and the painting and gilding of the latter, as well as the creation of painted panels to be placed side by side to form a polyptych.

On April 8, 1480, the wooden structure was commissioned from the sculptor Giacomo del Maino. The contractual delivery date was September 29, 1480, on the occasion of Michaelmas Day. On July 28, 1482, the brotherhood received a necklace from a certain Innocenzo Della Croce, intended to "adorn the neck of the Virgin in progress". On August 7, 1482, the Brotherhood signed a receipt for the altarpiece structure, which scholars describe as "monumental". On November 22 of the same year, the statue of the Virgin was delivered, which del Maino seems to have completed as early as July, and for which he asked for no payment.

On April 25, 1483, a notarized contract was signed between the Brotherhood and Leonardo da Vinci and the Predis brothers for the gilding and painting of the sculpted parts of the altarpiece, as well as three painted panels - the central panel, later known as the Virgin of the Rocks, and the two side panels of the Angels musicians. The contractual delivery date for the three panels stipulates "December 8", with no further details. Researchers generally agree on the year 1483. However, art historian Frank Zöllner pushes this date back to December 1484. In fact, the painting of La Vierge aux rochers would have been completely finished in early 1485, or even in 1486. However, after the painting was rejected by the brotherhood, Leonardo da Vinci and Ambrogio de Predis sold it to a third party - perhaps Ludovico Sforza (Ludovico el Moro) - around 1493, with the commissioner's agreement. This is the painting now in the Louvre.

A possible early version of Les Anges musiciens, now lost, may have suffered a similar fate. Between 1490 and 1499, and again between 1506 and 1508, the London version of La Vierge aux rochers was produced jointly by Giovanni Ambrogio de Predis, Leonardo da Vinci and probably his workshop while the panels of the Angels musicians were produced between 1495 and 1499 by Giovanni Ambrogio de Predis and Francesco Napoletano. On April 4, 1506, arbitrators declared that the panel of the Virgin of the Rocks had not been completed, and it was not until October 23, 1508, that the Confraternity of the Immaculate Conception signed a receipt for it. The altarpiece of the Immaculate Conception was therefore completed at this date.

However, between 1576 and 1579, the altarpiece may have been rearranged after its relocation within the church: from a position in the upper register, the two panels of the Angel musicians may have been moved to frame the panel of the Virgin of the Rocks.

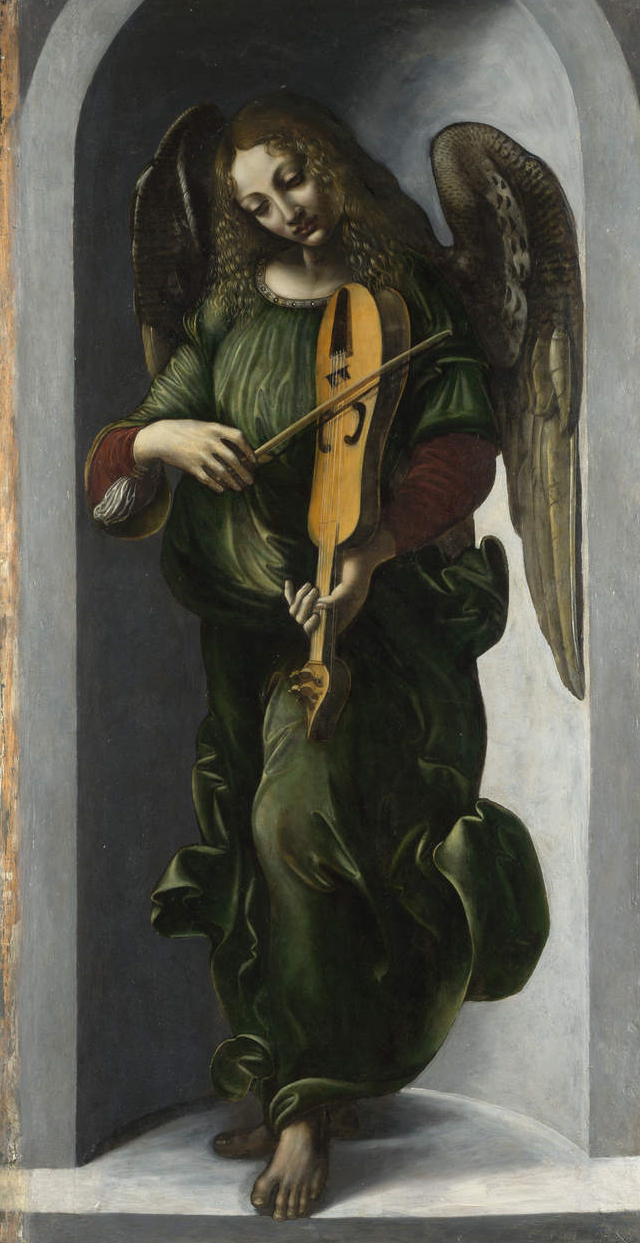
Francesco Napoletano's Angel musician in green playing the vielle, between 1495 and 1500, National Gallery, London

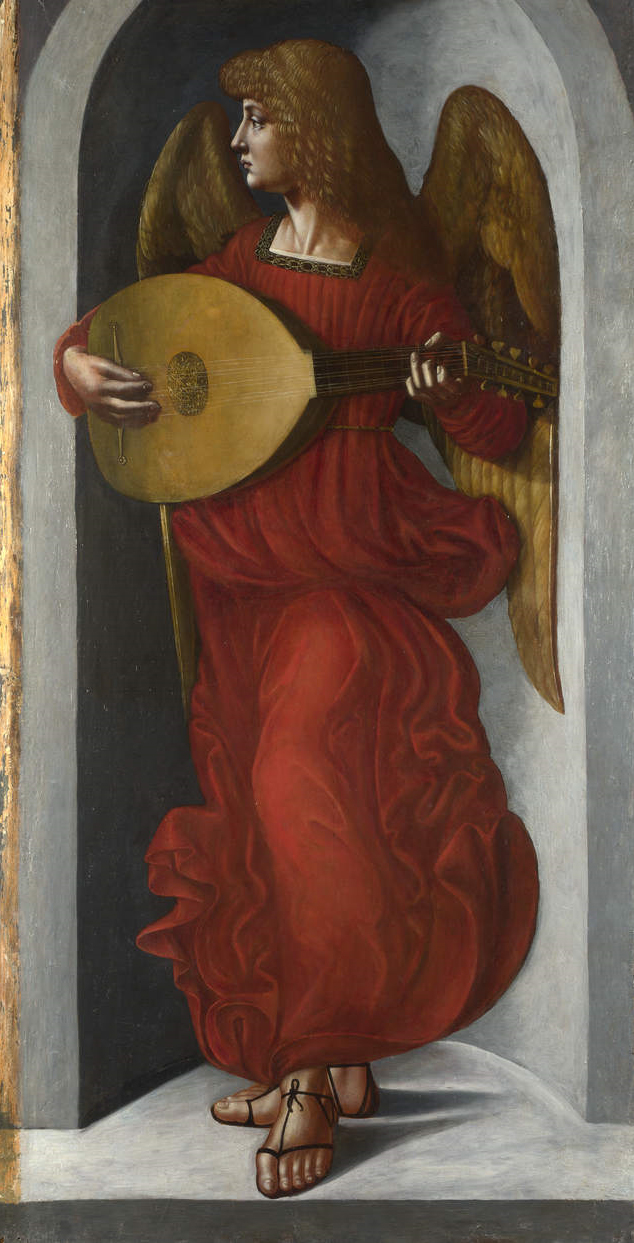
Angel musician in red by Giovanni Ambrogio de Predis, playing the lute, between 1495 and 1500, National Gallery, London

=== Financial aspects ===
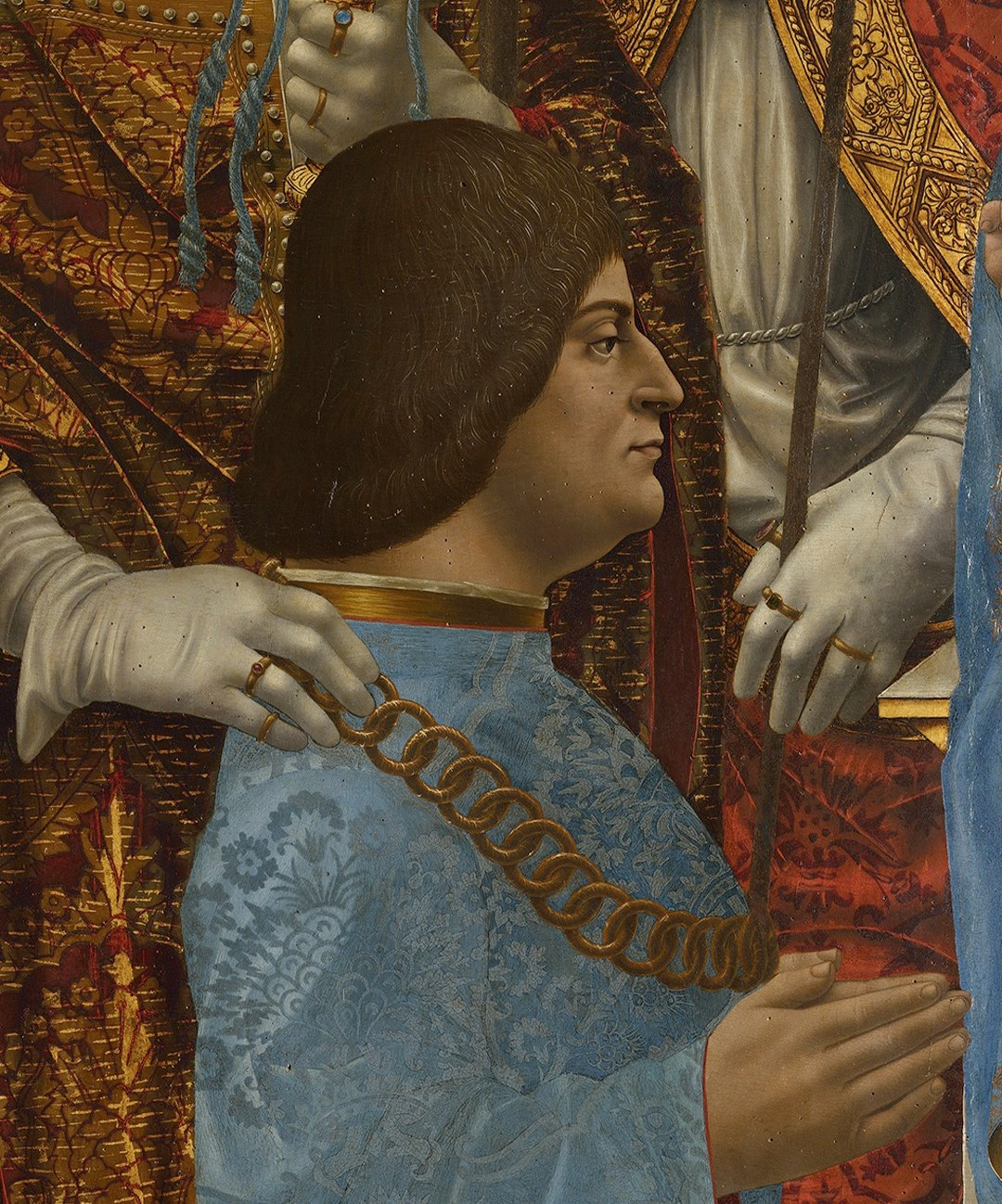
Portrait of Ludovico Sforza, also called Ludovico il Moro (the Moor) in the Pala Sforzesca, 1494–1495 (Pinacoteca di Brera in Milan)

This fraternity of aristocrats may be wealthy, but they are no less stingy with their means.

The total amount promised to the sculptor Giacomo del Maino was 710 lire. By August 7, 1482, del Maino, who had already received 490 lire, was struggling to receive the remainder. The situation necessitated the intervention of arbitrators from the Franciscan monastery: del Maino finally obtained his due, but with the obligation to place a votive object, today undetermined, in front of the image of the Virgin.

The contract between the Confraternity and the painters (Leonardo da Vinci and the Predis brothers) specifies the latter's remuneration. The sum allocated to them totaled 800 lire, covering not only their salaries but also the purchase of materials and, in particular, gold at a fixed price. A deposit of 100 lire was paid immediately, followed by monthly payments of 40 lire until the end of December 1484. Finally, a promise was made to pay an additional sum on completion of the work, to be decided by the friar Agostino Ferrari, who acted as expert on the occasion: it was this sum that formed the basis of a conflict destined to last twenty-five years between the commissioning parties and the artists. The artists argued that the 800 lire would barely cover the cost of the altarpiece, and asked for an additional 400 lire, in opposition to the 100 lire proposed by the confraternity. In the end, the artists rejected the mediation of the commissioned "common friend" on the grounds that he had no understanding of art - or, as they put it in a letter to Ludovico Sforza, also called Ludovico il Moro (the Moor), "a blind man cannot judge colors" and was therefore unable to assess the value of the works in question. However, this mediation is contractual, and the mediator has the power to settle any problems relating to the interpretation or performance of the contract, as well as to order the party he deems to be in default to pay penalties to the other party.

In the end, it was certainly the personal intervention of Ludovico Sforza, through the intermediary of certain jurists who were members of his council of justice, that resolved the dispute: he bought back the first version of the work, although we don't really know whether his action went beyond that.

== Possible appearance of the altarpiece ==
=== The order of April 25, 1483 ===
The 1483 contract by which the brotherhood hired Vinci and the Predis brothers for the painted panels is interesting in that it describes the structure already built.

"List of ornaments for the altarpiece of the Immaculate Conception of the Glorious Virgin Mary in the Church of San Francesco Grande, Milan:

- Firstly, we want the entire altarpiece, i.e., with the exception of the heads, the sculpted fields containing the figures, to be entirely gilded with fine gold at the price of 3 lire and 10 soldi per cent.
- Idem the vestment of Our Lady in the central panel with gold brocade and ultramarine blue
- Idem the dress of Our Lady in red lacquer and oil.
- Idem the lining of the vestment in gold brocade and green oil.
- Idem the seraphim in vermilion red and scratched paint.
- Idem God the Father with a gold brocade and ultramarine outer garment.
- Idem the mountains and stones, worked in oil and in different colors.
- Idem, on the side panels, four angels of different aspects, singing on one panel, playing an instrument on the other.
- Idem, in all parts where Our Lady appears, whether decorated as in the central panel, and the other figures in the Greek manner, adorned in different colors, in the Greek or modern manner. All shall be of as perfect workmanship as the buildings, mountains, plains, surfaces of all parts, and all things painted in oil; and defective wood carvings shall be repaired.
- Idem the sibyls and background, which will be made in the form of a niche, and the figures with different garments, all in oil.
- Idem the cornices, pilasters, capitals and all sculptures, which will be gilded as mentioned above, without mixing any color.
- Idem the surface of the central panel, where Our Lady will be painted in oil on the flat surface, in full perfection, in fine colors, with her son and the angels and with the two prophets, as mentioned above.
- Idem the plinth, which will be painted like the other interior parts.
- Idem the faces, hands and legs, which will be nude and colored to perfection in oil.
- Idem for the place where the Child is seated, which place will be worked with gold in the form of cruciferous".

=== 1503-1576: the Hannelore Glasser hypothesis ===
In the 2000s, based on Hannelore Glasser's doctoral thesis, art historians Rachel Billinge, Luke Syson and Marika Spring put forward a hypothesis that is far from unanimous among scholars: initially and until 1576, the two panels of the Angel musicians would have been above Leonardo da Vinci's, i.e. in the upper register, with the Virgin of the Rocks occupying the central register. This is based on the fact that the list in the commission contract for the painted panels describes the altarpiece from top to bottom: the two paintings of the Angel musicians are mentioned before what appears to be the votive statue of the Virgin and before the Leonardo da Vinci painting. This initial arrangement would explain the disharmony of the initial colors. of the Angel musicians' backgrounds and, according to Luke Syson, their " poor quality ".

=== 1579-late 18th century: appearance as traditionally described ===
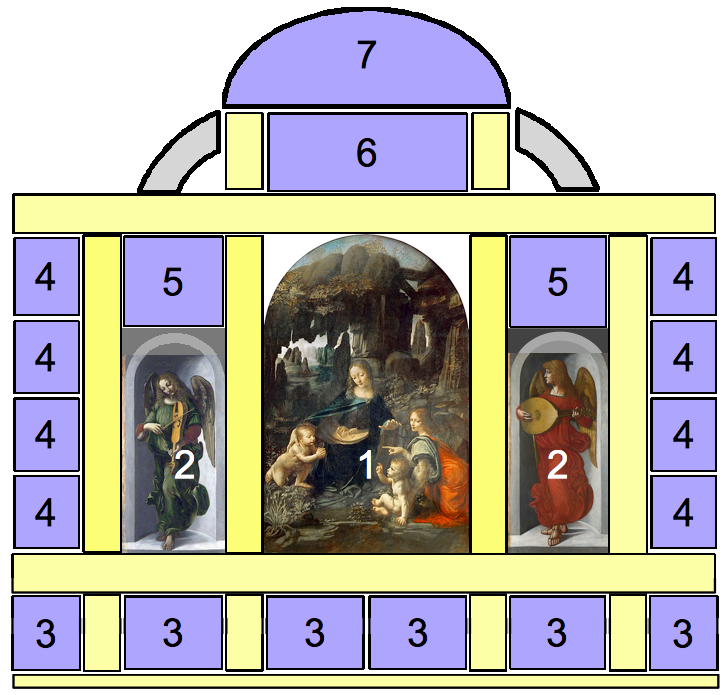
Design of the altarpiece based on hypotheses by Carlo Pedretti, Malaguzzi-Valeri, Frank Zöllner and Gerolamo Biscaro, according to the commission contract.: Blue: Figures in bas-relief; Yellow: Altarpiece support structure; 1. Panel of the Virgin of the Rocks; 2. Side panels depicting the Angel musicians; 3. Scenes from the life of the Virgin; 4. Scenes from the life of the Virgin; 5. Unknown; 6. The Virgin with a glory of angels; 7. Representation of God the Father with a glory of seraphim

In 1576, when the chapel of the Immaculate Conception was destroyed, the altarpiece was moved to another chapel in the church, where it would be installed for a longer period of time, taking on the name of the "Immaculate Conception". On this occasion, it may be restructured to adopt the form that art historians have since described. Nevertheless, this need for restructuring remains largely conjectural, since the hypothesis of a different structural scheme for the altarpiece prior to 1576 remains very much in the minority among researchers. What's more, the list of requests made in the contract does indeed use the term "laterals": "Idem, on the side panels, four angels of different aspects, etc.". In any case, a testimony from 1671 describes the altarpiece with the panel of La Vierge aux rochers framed by the panels of the Angel musicians: the panel on the left is the Angel musician in green playing the vielle, and the panel on the right is the Angel musician in red playing the lute.

The commission contract dated April 25, 1483 is an excellent means of obtaining a somewhat accurate picture of the now lost altarpiece. Overall, it consisted of bas-reliefs, sculptures, including the statue of the Virgin Mary, and painted panels. Contrary to what the modern viewer might imagine, influenced by the fame of the painting Virgin of the Rocks and its creator Leonardo da Vinci, it is indeed the votive statue of the Virgin created by del Maino that constitutes for the contemporary viewer the point around which the altarpiece is built.

==== The cymatium ====
The content of the cymatium - the highest part of the altarpiece - is, thanks to a reading of the contract, unanimously recognized: it features a sculpture of God the Father surrounded by angels and seraphim.

Surprisingly, the contract goes on to mention "mountains and rocks", without researchers knowing exactly where to situate them.

==== The upper register ====
The altarpiece features a statue of the Virgin Mary created by del Maino, wearing a garment painted to imitate "gold and ultramarine brocade". Researchers disagree, however, as to its place on the piece: either in the upper register, i.e. above the panel of the Virgin of the Rocks, for some, or hidden by the latter, i.e. in the lower register, for others. Also visible is a necklace offered by a donor, made up of fourteen solid fine gold flowers adorned with as many pearls and, between each flower, a letter, the whole of which most probably makes up the name "Maria Immacolata". Its location is also uncertain: around the statue's neck, or directly on the painting. In the 1990s, scientific imaging enabled Pietro C. Marani to detect a clue in Leonardo da Vinci's painting corroborating the latter hypothesis: two holes on either side of the Virgin's neck, filled in with plaster and repainted.

==== The lower register: the Virgin of the Rocks and the musician angels ====
The altarpiece features a central panel painted by Leonardo da Vinci entitled the Virgin of the Rocks. This is the second version of the painting, preserved in London, and the only one actually displayed in the altarpiece. Many art historians speculate that this painting was in fact a removable panel designed to conceal the votive statue of the Virgin sculpted by del Maino and intended to be unveiled every December 8, the feast of the Immaculate Conception. According to Costantino D'Orazio, this possible mechanism denotes "a futuristic work, like the mobile altarpieces that were particularly fashionable in the 17th century". However, Pietro C. Marani points out that the panel of La Vierge aux rochers conserved in London shows no trace of a hinge or hanging system that could confirm this hypothesis.

Two panels were intended to accompany it, the Angel musicians, for which Giovanni Ambrogio de Predis. was contractually responsible. From then on, the three panels were hung together to form a polyptych. The vast majority of scholars agree that these two paintings frame the Virgin of the Rocks as early as the altarpiece's creation. In the two triangular sections above the arch of Leonardo's painting appear images of sibyls, prophetesses, symbols of the expectation of gentiles who had glimpsed Christ.

==== Lateral pilasters ====
Gerolamo Biscaro is the only researcher to mention them, pointing out the presence of lateral pilasters depicting sculpted scenes from the life of the Virgin Mary.

==== The predella ====
The predella - the lowest part of the altarpiece - is made up of sculpted, painted and gilded panels depicting scenes in relief from the life of the Virgin Mary. One of these could have depicted Jesus in a crib.

== Location in the church of Saint-François-Majeur ==
Saint-François-Majeur Church: the altarpiece, originally located in the chapel

=== At the time of reception ===
From 1503 onward, the altarpiece can be considered almost complete: only the painting of the Virgin of the Rocks remains unfinished, until 1508, when the brotherhood can sign the certificate of receipt marking the completion of the whole. The altarpiece stands in the Chapel of the Immaculate Conception, near the atrium.

=== Movements inside the church and modifications ===
The chapel of the Immaculate Conception was destroyed in 1576, and in 1579 the altarpiece was moved to the chapel of Saint-Jean-Baptiste, not far from the choir. This chapel was then renamed the "Chapel of the Immaculate Conception".

On this occasion, the altarpiece was dismantled and restructured, as evidenced by the saw marks on the two panels of the Angel musicians, indicating that their dimensions had been altered. Similarly, the background colors underwent profound changes: the Angel musician in green, playing the vielle, featured a background dominated by green and a landscape of green and blue, while the Angel musician in red, playing the lute, featured a reddish niche, certainly imitating stone. However, the backgrounds were repainted in gray, probably with the aim of standardizing the colors.

In 1671, a witness describes the altarpiece with the panel of La Vierge aux rochers framed by those of the Angels musicians. This description is confirmed by another account dating from 1716: "On the sides, it has two isolated chapels dedicated to the Conception of the Blessed Virgin devoid of any original fault, here we see a painted picture by Leonardo da Vinci with two lateral angels".

In 1781, an inventory of the furnishings in the chapel of the Immaculate Conception was drawn up, providing a brief description of the altarpiece. As the altarpiece shows significant differences in color and form from the contract specifications, it is possible to assume that restoration work had been carried out in previous centuries: the flesh tones of the faces and exposed parts of the bodies were replaced by a uniform bronze color; the size of the altarpiece was reduced, certainly by removing decomposed parts of the wood, notably by eliminating its upper half.

=== A dismantled altarpiece ===
In 1781, the three paintings making up the altarpiece of the Immaculate Conception were separated: the Virgin of the Rocks was sold to an English collector. An account dating from 1798 indicates that the Angel musicians, still in their place in the altarpiece, frame the void left by Leonardo da Vinci's painting. As for the panels of the musician angels, they were sequestered in the "Fonds de la religion de la République Cisalpine (Italian: Fondo di religione della Republica Cisalpina) after the creation of the Cisalpine Republic by General Bonaparte and they were then sold in 1802 to an Italian art collector, Giacomo Melzi. Finally, in 1806, the Church of St. Francis Maggiore (basilica vetus), deemed dilapidated and dangerous, was demolished, and since then, the structure of the altarpiece and the statue of the Madonna sculpted by del Maino have been considered lost.

== Analysis ==
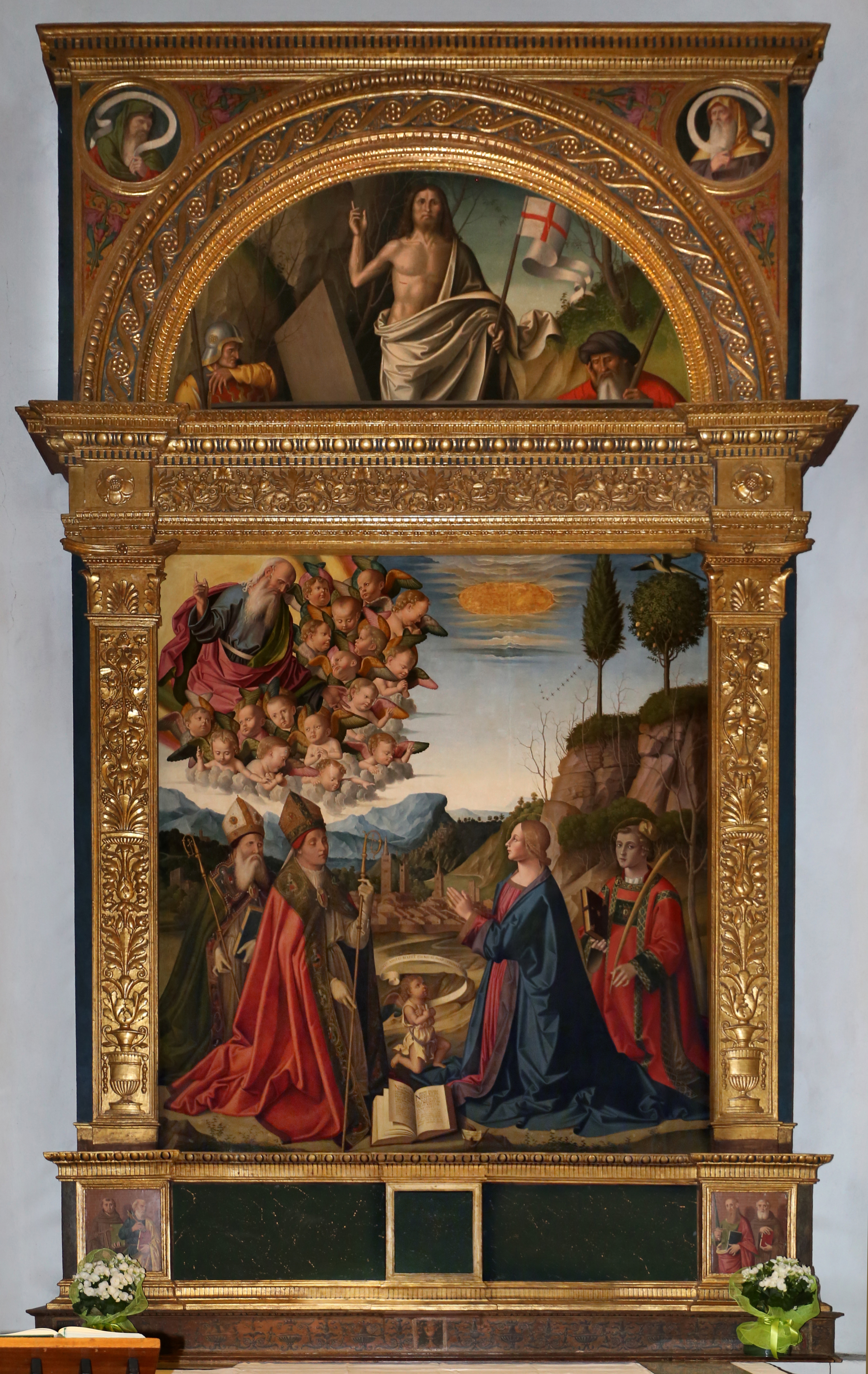
Marco Palmezzano, Immaculate Conception with God the Father and Saints Anselm, Augustine, and Stephen and, on the picture rail, The Resurrection, 1509, Forlì, Abbey of Saint Mercuriale

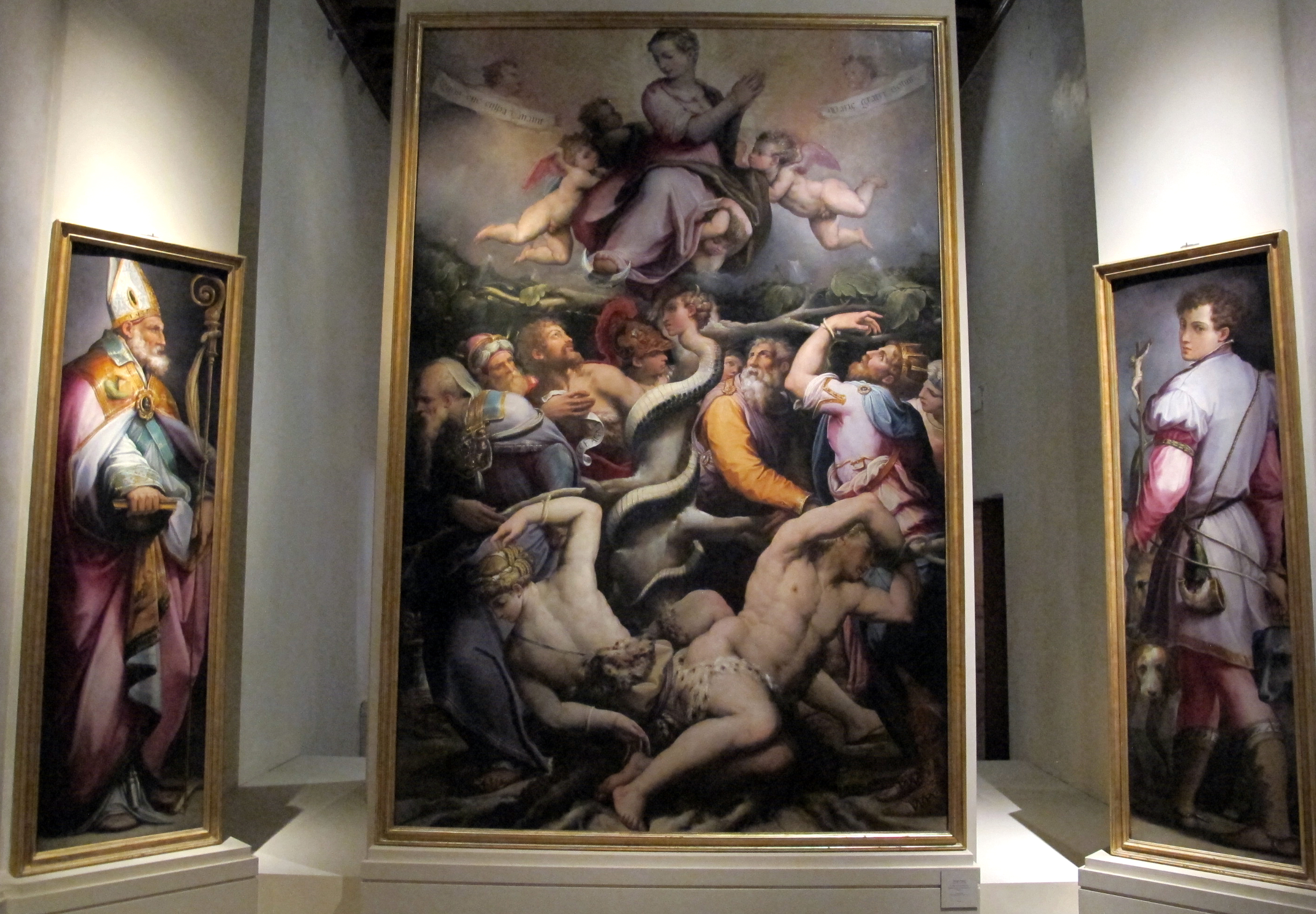
Pala de ll'Imacolata Concezione by Giorgio Vasari, 1543, Museum of Medieval and Modern Art, Arezzo

=== Colors and setting ===
The altarpiece, painted and gilded by Evangelis de Predis, is polychrome.

Nevertheless, two colors dominate the whole:Marian blue, and gold. It therefore appears that Leonardo da Vinci took this into account when he created the National Gallery's version of the Virgin of the Rocks, which is also dominated by blue. What's more, he proceeded by contrasting light and shade: whereas the Louvre version featured warm skin tones against a cool background, the London version features cool skin tones against a warm background, giving the colors "the edge of moonlight".

The altarpiece's environment also needs to be taken into account: it is exhibited in a chapel, which can be imagined as quite dark, lit by candles, and which can be seen as an extension of the cavernous decor offered by the work's sculpted parts and Leonardo da Vinci's panel.

=== The theme of the Immaculate Conception ===
The Immaculate Conception is a relatively late dogma in the Catholic Church, developed in particular in the writings of Duns Scotus (John Duns Scotus, c. 1266 - 1308), a Scottish theologian and Franciscan friar. This dogma was opposed to the Dominican view that Mary was purified only in the womb of her mother Anne, after conception, and that the Franciscans' idea was heretical. At the time of the altarpiece's creation, there was little or no artistic representation of the doctrine and, in any case, it was not yet the subject of established and stable artistic conventions: it is therefore possible to consider the altarpiece a precursory work in the field. In fact, it could be the result of a composite assemblage of theological writings, representations of other dogmas linked to the Virgin (the Annunciation or the Assumption of Mary, for example) and Christian symbols that were fixed or in the process of being established. Thus, the figures of sibyls and Christian prophets, visible on the void left by the top of the painting's arch, are beginning to establish themselves in contemporary painting specifically dedicated to the Immaculate Conception, notably in Tuscany.

This may explain why, in the first version of the Virgin of the Rocks, Leonardo da Vinci took the liberty of drawing inspiration from a Gnostic and Christian mystical work entitled the Apocalypsis nova (preserved in the Biblioteca Ambrosiana in Milan), authored by Amadeus of Portugal (born João de Menezes da Silva, c.1420-1482 ) - a Portuguese Catholic religious reformer of the Franciscan order who ministered in Milan - who affirms the primacy of the figures of Mary and John the Baptist in the mystery of the Immaculate Conception. Nevertheless, Leonardo's proposal was deemed heterodox by the brotherhood, who rejected it and asked for a second one.

Finally, the study of the Virgin of the Rocks as a representation of the dogma of the Immaculate Conception can be problematic. Indeed, this idea is not evident in the painting, which is more concerned with the meeting between the Holy Family and John's family during the flight to Egypt, at the time of the massacre of the Innocents: it should be considered that it is indeed the statue of the Virgin created by Giacomo del Maino that bears this idea.
