= De Giacomo =

De or de Giacomo is a patronymic surname of Italian origin, derived from the personal name Giacomo. Notable people with the surname include:

- Costantino De Giacomo (fl. 1980–present), Italian gastroenterologist
- Giuseppe De Giacomo (born 1965), Italian computer scientist
- Juan de Giacomo (1913–????), Argentine sports shooter

== See also ==
- Di Giacomo, a cognate
