= Di Giacomo =

Di or di Giacomo is a surname. Notable people with the surname include:

- Andrea di Niccolò di Giacomo (1440–1514), Italian painter
- Daniela di Giacomo (born 1985), Venezuelan TV host, journalist, radio host, model and beauty queen
- Federica Di Giacomo, director and writer of the 2016 documentary Libera Nos
- Francesco Di Giacomo (1947–2014), Italian singer and lyricist
- Franco Di Giacomo (1932–2016), Italian cinematographer
- Gegè Di Giacomo (1918–2005), Italian singer and drummer, nephew of Savatore Di Giacomo
- Luis Di Giacomo (born 1954), Argentine psychiatrist and politician
- Marina di Giacomo (born 1976), Argentine field hockey player
- Paul di Giacomo (born 1982), Scottish footballer
- Salvatore Di Giacomo (1860–1934), Italian poet, songwriter, playwright and fascist

== See also ==
- De Giacomo, a cognate
