= Angel musicians (National Gallery) =

Panels for the Virgin of the Rocks

An Angel in Green with a Vielle
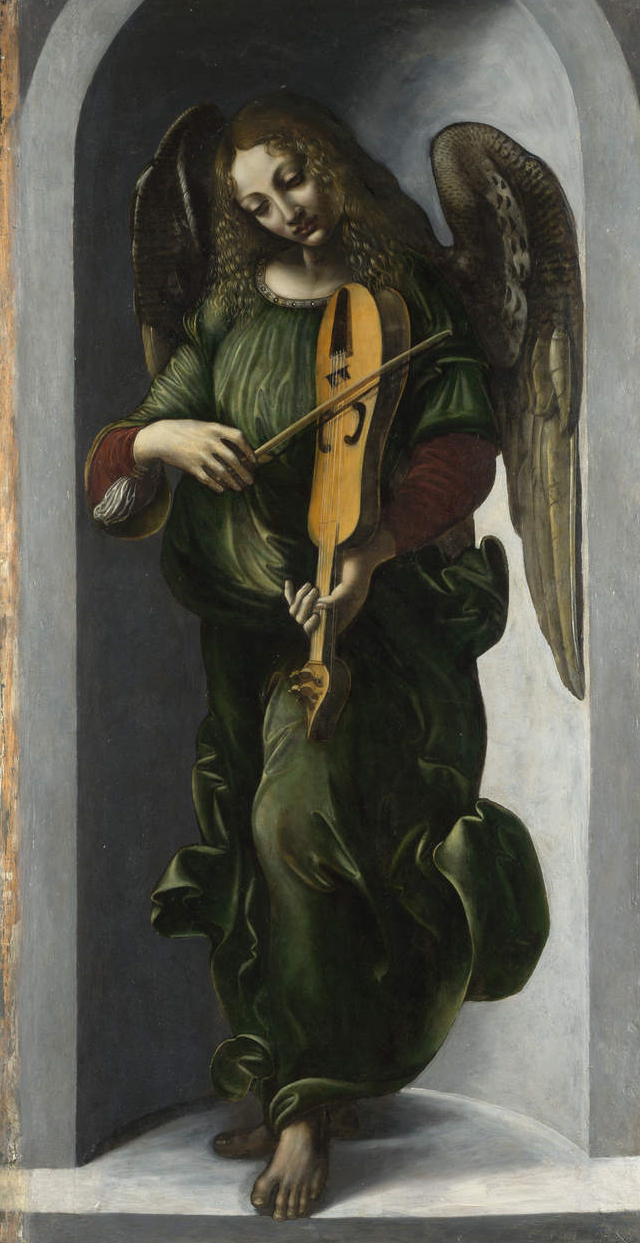
- Artist: Giovanni Ambrogio de Predis ? Francesco Napoletano ?
- Year: Between 1495 and 1499
- Catalogue: NG1661
- Dimensions: 117.2 cm × 60.8 cm (46.14 in × 23.93 in)
- Location: National Gallery, London (United Kingdom)
- Owner: National Gallery

An Angel in Red with a Lute
- Artist: Giovanni Ambrogio de Predis
- Year: Between 1495 and 1499
- Catalogue: NG1662
- Dimensions: 118.8 cm × 61 cm (46.8 in × 24 in)
- Location: National Gallery, London (United Kingdom)
- Owner: National Gallery

The Angel musicians are two paintings created in the late 15th century to frame Leonardo da Vinci's Virgin of the Rocks. Their purpose was to decorate the side panels of the Altarpiece in the Chapel of the Immaculate Conception, created to decorate a chapel in the Church of San Francesco Grande in Milan. Separated from their original altarpiece at the very end of the 18th century, they have been in the National Gallery in London since 1898.

Both paintings are dated between 1495 and 1499. The first is entitled Angel in Green with a Vielle; it has long been attributed to the Italian Renaissance painter Giovanni Ambrogio de Predis, but recent research shows that it may instead be due to Francesco Napoletano, one of Leonardo da Vinci's pupils. The second, entitled Angel in Red with lute, is generally attributed to Ambrogio de Predis. The influence of Leonardo da Vinci is evident in the treatment of these classical figures.

Although the two paintings are described in documents dating from the time of their creation, these are only indirectly so, since they mainly concern The Virgin of the Rocks. As a result, they remain objects of speculation for researchers as to their status as first or second versions of the work, their creation, attribution, dating, exact placement on the altarpiece and the reasons for their alterations over time - particularly regarding the background color.

== Description ==
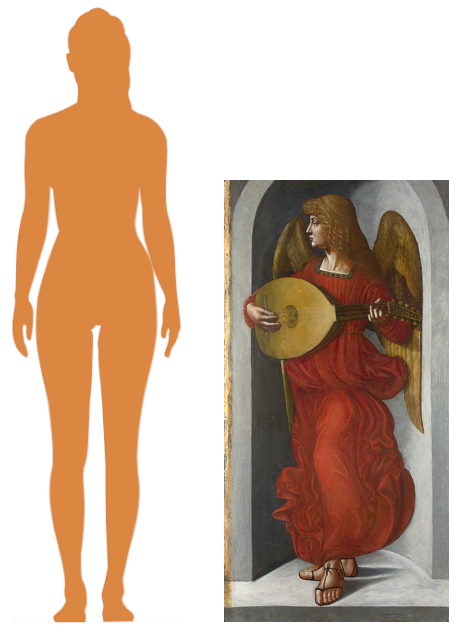
Indicative size comparison between a woman of average stature (165 cm) and the Angel in Red painting (118.8 × 61 cm).

Both paintings are mounted on an identical support: poplar panels. Both use the same medium: walnut oil paint. Their dimensions, very similar, are 117.2 × 60.8 cm for the Angel in Green and 118.8 × 61 cm for the Angel in Red.

The two panels share many similarities: each features a single full-length figure, standing in a trompe-l'œil niche featuring the same gradations of gray. The figures stand on their right legs, with their left feet pointing towards the viewer. Wings open slightly behind their backs, indicating their angelic nature. With long, curly hair, they are dressed in long, colored robes, one with a round collar, the other with a square collar. Each holds a musical instrument, which they appear to play. Their differences lie in the instrument they play, their posture, and the appearance and position of their heads. The angel in green is playing the lira da braccio; (Note: Although this instrument belongs to the vielle family, it differs in that one or two drone strings run parallel to the handle. On the work, such a string is clearly visible under the figure's left thumb. Scott Jones, Sterling; et al. (Publications of the Early Music Institute) (1995). "4: The Lira Da Braccio in Works of Art". The Lira Da Braccio. Bloomington: Indiana University Press. pp. 16–56, 25–26. ISBN 978-0-253-20911-5. OCLC 30112539.) he appears to be rubbing the bow on the strings. He inclines his head towards his instrument in a posture identical to that of the Virgin in Leonardo da Vinci's the Virgin of the Rocks. The angel in red plays the lute; his hand plucks the strings. His face, seen in profile, is turned to the viewer's left.

== History ==
=== Attributions ===
Researchers agree that the two panels originated in Leonardo da Vinci's studio: indeed, they resemble the style used by the master in the London version of the central panel of the retable (the Virgin of the Rocks); moreover, the three panels of the altarpiece demonstrate similar technical processes - the use of fingers, for example, to finish the contours of the figures - which, in some cases, are the source of identical problems - such as cracks in the paint layer appearing as soon as the drying process begins.

More precisely, tradition has long held that the two paintings were by Giovanni Ambrogio de Predis alone, since he was one of three artists named in the commission contract, each with a role identified by art historians: Leonardo da Vinci for the central panel of the altarpiece, Evangelista de Predis for the gilding and his brother Ambrogio for the two side panels. However, numerous stylistic and technical clues tend to show that the two works, despite their great visual similarities, were produced by two different hands. The attribution of the Angel in Red thus enjoys a consensus in favor of Giovanni Ambrogio de Predis. While the Angel in Green was long attributed to the same painter, research carried out at the end of the 20th century now links it much more surely to Francesco Napoletano, a pupil of Leonardo da Vinci. Indeed, the technical characteristics visible through scientific imagery alone, such as the very different proportion between the colors and the black for the rendering of the skin, indicate that the painting is probably by an artist different from the one who created the Angel in Red. Furthermore, technical and stylistic comparisons with Napoletano's creations from the same period, such as Madonna and Child (now in the Brera Academy of Fine Arts in Milan) or Madonna and Child with St. Sebastian and St. John the Baptist (now in Zurich), both dated from the late 1480s, point to this painter. Finally, the hypothesis of another disciple of Leonardo da Vinci, Marco d'Oggiono, is sometimes evoked but without convincing.

A comparison that allows us to attribute
the Angel in Green to Francesco Napoletano.
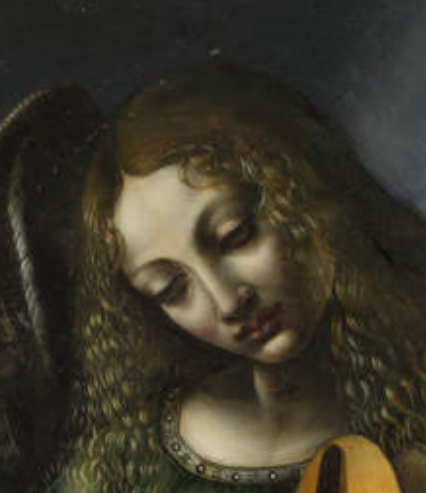
Detail of the angel in green.

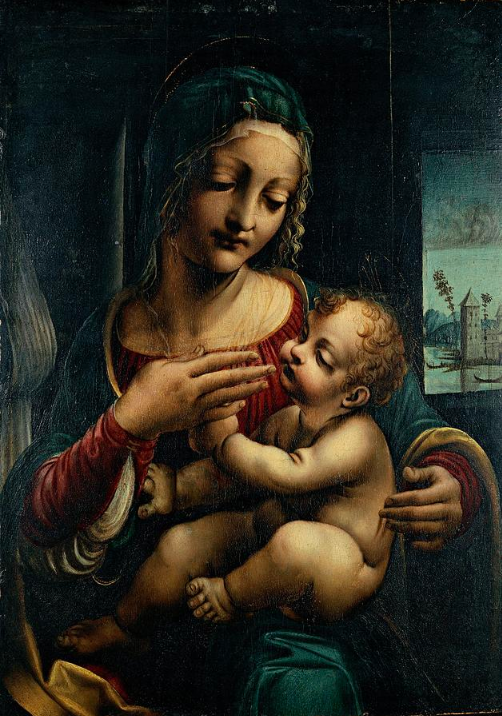
Francesco Napoletano, Madonna and Child, late 1480s, Milan, Brera Academy of Fine Arts.
A comparison that allows us to attribute
the Angel in red to Ambrogio de Predis
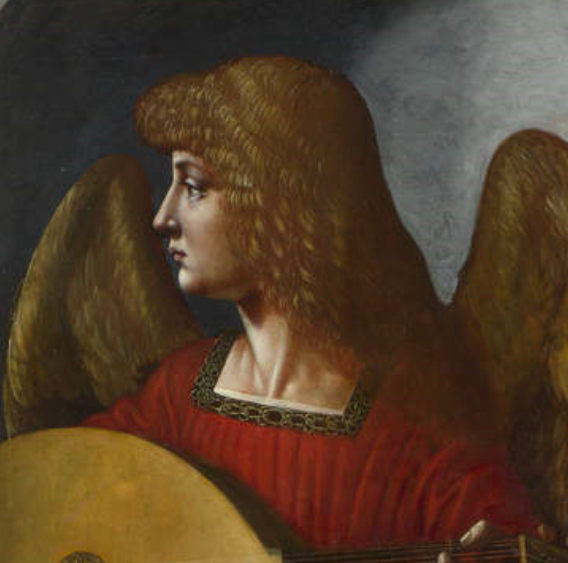
Detail of the angel in red.

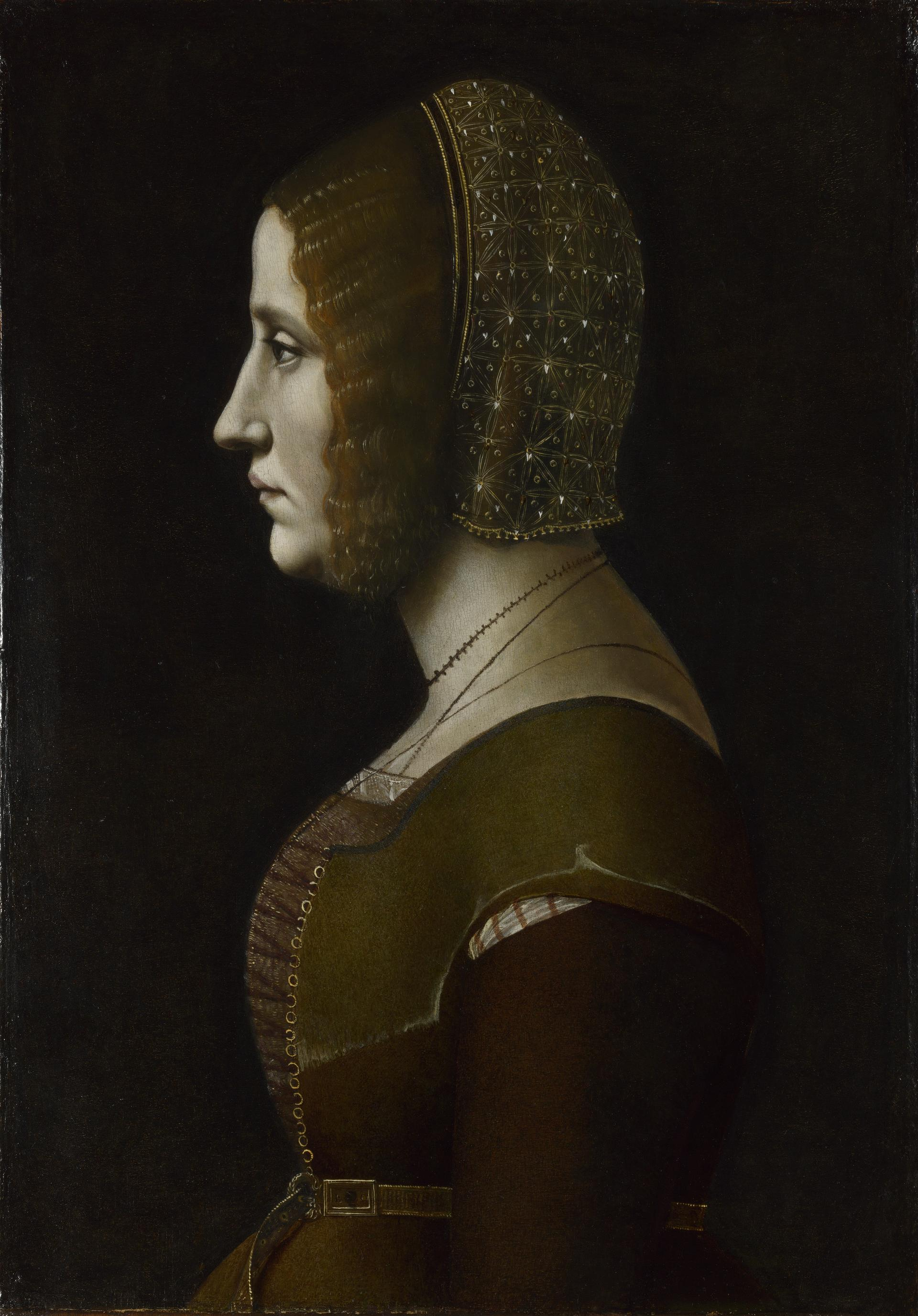
Ambrogio de Predis, Portrait of a Woman in Profile, between 1495 and 1499, London, National Gallery.

=== Titles ===
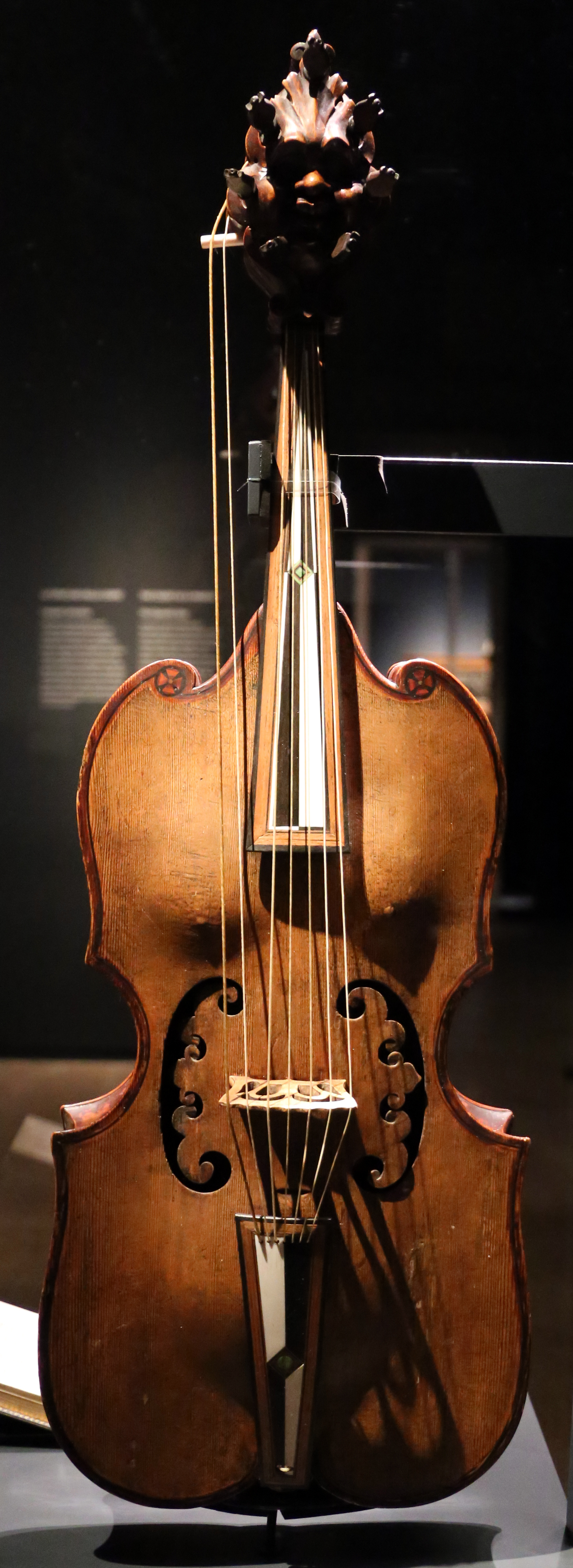
The instrument played by the angel in green: a lira da braccio.

The modern titles of the works correspond to their descriptions. They are established throughout the scientific literature as Angel in Red with a Lute and Angel in Green with a Vielle. However, with regard to the latter painting, most art historians specializing in painting incorrectly identify the instrument played by the angel as a vielle, whereas he is actually playing the lira da braccio. Although it should be Angel in Green with a lira da braccio, it is a title that has become inappropriate in both French and English.

=== Dating ===
It is reasonable to think that the two paintings were produced at the same time, between 1495 and 1499, even if this contradicts the National Gallery's estimate, which dates the Angel in Green between 1490 and 1499.

Certainly, at the earliest, and taking into account the preparatory phase of the works' production, both paintings were created from 1490 onwards, as they are clearly inspired by the London version of the Virgin of the Rocks, which itself is dated between 1491 and 1499 (then, after a pause of a few years, between 1506 and 1508). But more precisely, it is accepted that the Angel in Green was inspired by the figure of John the Apostle in The Last Supper (1495-1498, Milan, Church of Santa Maria delle Grazie), whose creation dates back to 1495. What's more, Ambrogio de Predis didn't return from Innsbruck, where he was in the company of Francesco Napoletano at the invitation of Bianca Maria Sforza, until July of that year. Finally, technical analysis clearly indicates that the two panels were created at the same time, thus ruling out the possibility that they were created several years apart, as has been argued.

Moreover, this creation could not have taken place after 1501, the date of the death of Francesco Napoletano, the putative author of the Angel in Green.

Nonetheless, a minority of authors strongly postpone the creation of the two panels: in particular, they rely on the hypothesis that Giovanni de Predis drew inspiration for the Angel in Red from Leonardo da Vinci's portrait of Isabella d'Este, which dates from 1499 to 1500. They put the creation date at 1506–1508, i.e. during the final production period of the Virgin of the Rocks. (Note: However, this hypothesis is hampered by the death in 1501 of Francesco Napoletano, considered by researchers to be the most likely author of the Angel in Green panel, which was created at the same time as the Angel in Red. Syson & Keith (2011, p. 172))

=== Creation context and initial commission ===
The creation of the Angel Musicians panels was part of the decoration of a retable, the Altarpiece of the Immaculate Conception, itself the centerpiece of a newly built chapel, between 1475 and 1480, within the Church of San Francesco Grande in Milan. In 1482, the woodcarver Giacomo del Maino (before 1469 - 1503 or 1505) delivered a large-scale structure that still had to be decorated. Three artists, the brothers Evangelista and Ambrogio de Predis and Leonardo da Vinci. were commissioned to gild the timbers and carved parts, and paint the panels. Ambrogio was responsible for creating the two panels dedicated to the angel musicians, most certainly under Leonardo's supervision. In all probability, these two paintings were intended to frame what would much later be known as the Madonna of the Rocks. (Note: Although it remains the majority view among researchers (Blatt (2018, p. 6), Carlo Pedretti (Pedretti & Taglialagamba (2017, p. 204)),Biscaro (1910), Zöllner (2017, pp. 93, 111, 355) or as reported by The National Gallery for example), this hypothesis is sometimes contested. Rachel Billinge, Luke Syson and Marika Spring, for example, based on Hannelore Glasser's doctoral thesis (Glasser, Hannelore; et al. (Outstanding dissertations in the fine art) (1977). Artists' Contracts of the Early Renaissance (Doctoral thesis). New York, London: Garland Pub (New York). ISBN 978-0-8240-2694-3. OCLC 644932802.) suggest that the two paintings were initially located above Leonardo da Vinci's until 1579, arguing that the contract's enumeration of requests was from the top to the bottom of the altarpiece. Such an arrangement is not unprecedented, since it can also be found in the Altarpiece of the Virgin preserved in the church of Saint-Maurice in Ponte in Valtellina. Billinge, Syson & Spring (2011, p. 59)) According to the commission contract, each panel was to feature four angels, some singing, others playing music. In the end, however, each panel featured just one angel musician: the angel on the left played the lira da braccio and the one on the right played the lute.

=== Sponsor and progress of the works ===
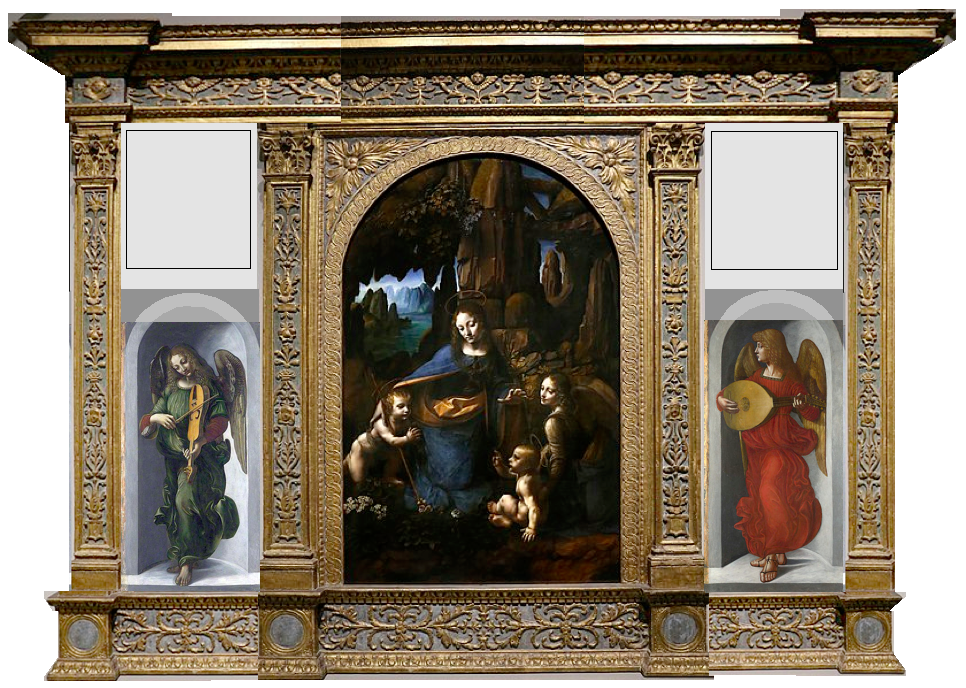
Proposed reconstruction of the Altarpiece of the Immaculate Conception (based on works in the National Gallery).

The work was commissioned by the Confraternity of the Immaculate Conception, a Milanese secular confraternity attached to the church of San Francesco Grande in Milan (Italian: San Fransesco Grande): a contract was signed before a notary on April 25, 1483, between the confraternity on the one hand, and Leonardo da Vinci and the portraitists and miniaturists, the brothers Evangelis and Giovanni Ambrogio de Predis on the other. The contractual delivery date for the two panels is the same as for the central panel, the Virgin of the Rocks, i.e. December 8, 1483. (Note: In the case of the Virgin of the Rocks, this date is the subject of debate among scholars, for although the contract indicates a deadline of "December 8" - corresponding to the feast of the Immaculate Conception - it does not specify the year: most art historians maintain that it is the year of the contract, i.e. 1483.29.30 Nevertheless, Frank Zöllner, recalling the twenty-four to thirty months that had been estimated for the Adoration of the Magi a few years earlier, considers that seven months is an insufficient timeframe for such a large-scale project, and pushes the deadline back to December 1484.21)

However, the commissioners were dissatisfied with Leonardo's work, and he was obliged to sell his first production and produce a second one from the early 1490s onwards. This raises the question of the identification and dating of the two side panels, since it is highly probable that they met with an identical fate, and that those currently in the National Gallery are not the ones originally painted for the altarpiece. Indeed, like the London version of the Virgin of the Rocks, which replaced the one in the Louvre on the altarpiece, they could be the second version of a first one, now lost, (Note: In fact, the discrepancy between the requirements of the commission contract, which calls for four angels on each of the two panels, and the currently visible panels, which each depict a single angel, could be a revealing clue.Marani & Villata (1999, p. 132)) and may have been sold to the person who bought the first version of the central panel. In any case, these are the two panels we know of, which were exhibited in the altarpiece with the second version of the Virgin of the Rocks by 1503 at the latest.

1781 marked the separation of the works making up the Immaculate Conception altarpiece, as the Virgin of the Rocks was sold to an English collector: in fact, testimony from 1798 indicates that the Angel musicians were still in their place in the altarpiece, framing the gap left by Leonardo da Vinci's painting. After the creation of the Cisalpine Republic by General Bonaparte, they were sequestered in the "Religious Fund of the Cisalpine Republic" (Italian: Fondo di religione della Republica Cisalpina) to be sold in 1802, shortly before his death, to the art collector Giacomo Melzi. In 1898, his descendant Giovanni Melzi d'Eril sold them to the National Gallery, where they have remained ever since.

=== Modifications and preservation state ===
After their creation, both panels underwent modifications in their dimensions: enlargement in length - and repainting accordingly - and, on the contrary, reduction in height. In particular, it seems that their upper parts must originally have been arch-shaped, as in the central panel of the Vierge of the Rocks. Finally, studies carried out in 1975 have shown that the backgrounds currently appearing as grey niches are repaints: behind the Angel in Green were two masses, one green topped by another bluish, certainly corresponding to a landscape, the frame certainly corresponding to an opening, like an arcade-shaped bay; and the background of the Angel in Red featured a niche whose pinkish color was intended as an imitation of red-brown stone.

The panels are in an average state of preservation. Indeed, their pictorial surfaces appearing in grey show adhesion problems, as these areas were repainted over a layer of dirty varnish. In addition, other areas have suffered from drying complications during their creation, resulting in cracking, particularly in the darker areas and draperies; this is particularly evident on the panel of the Angel in Red, on a large area of repainting corresponding to the sound box of the lute and the figures's arm.

== Creation ==
=== Creation process ===
Researchers consider that the two painters based their work on the use of an identical model: indeed, the bodies of the two figures are very similar in height, pose and the drapery they bear; more significantly, the right arms and shoulders were superimposed before the angel's arm in red was moved during creation, as shown by scientific imaging analysis.

The underlying design of each work indicates the use of two very different techniques, confirming that the works are indeed by two painters: for instance, the creator of the angel in green used a cartoon, a technical process in which the painter transfers his drawing onto the prepared support by pricking it with needles; as for the angel in red, the painter used a grid, visible by reflectography, then reproduced the drawing freehand.

X-ray analysis shows that the two paintings were created in two distinct phases: the creation of the figures' bodies, followed by the creation of their heads. A comparison of the underlying drawings for the different areas shows that particular attention and meticulousness were paid to the head in each work: the researchers deduce that distinct studies were produced for these areas, without this necessarily implying that these parts are from different hands.

Finally, the infrared reflectography analysis carried out by the National Gallery's laboratory reveals a large area of pentimento on the panel of the Angel in Red: in effect, the lute's sound box and the figure's arm have been off-centered towards the edge of the painting.

=== Influences ===
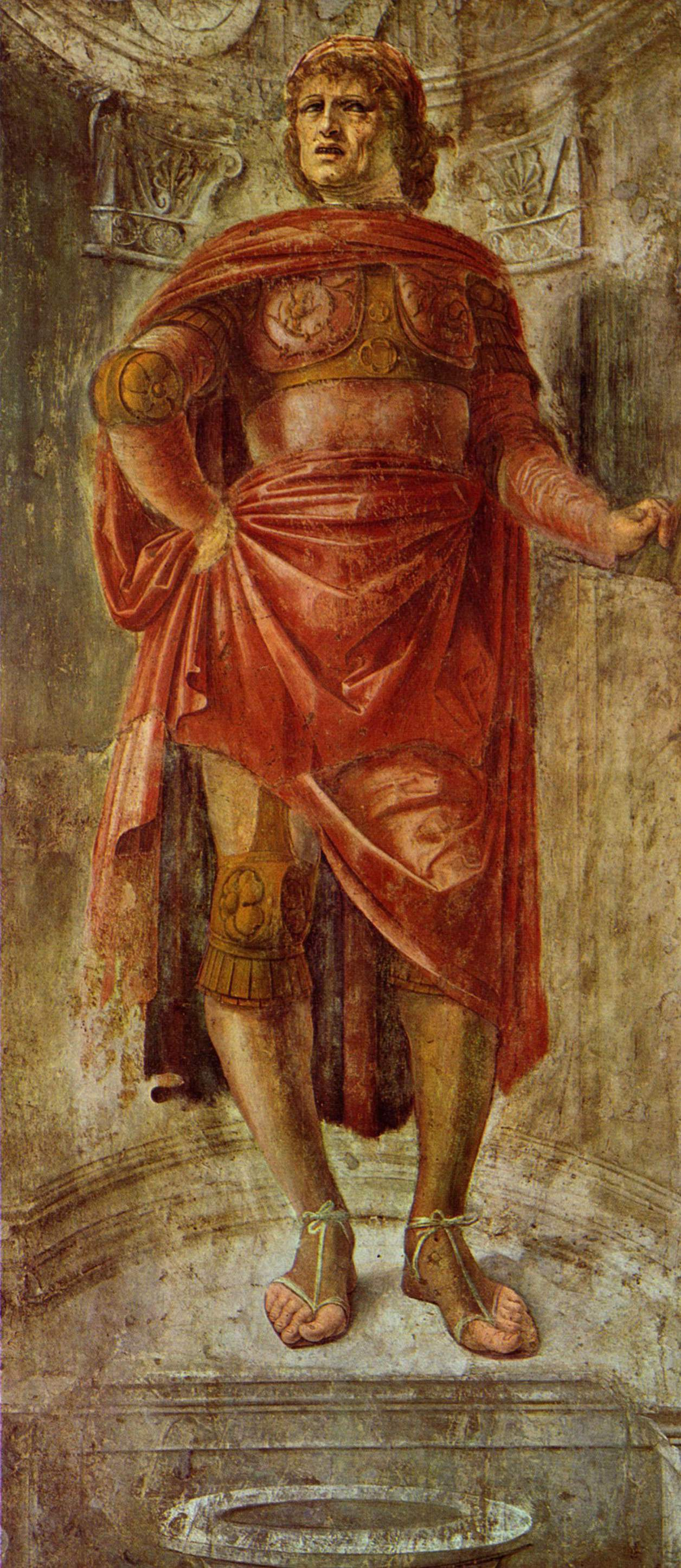
Bramante, Man with Two-hand Sword from the Men at Arms fresco series, 1486–1487, Milan, Pinacoteca di Brera.

As representations of full-length figures set within niches, the Musician Angels are clearly inspired by the angle of view, attitude and situation of the figures in the Men-at-Arms fresco series painted by Bramante just a few years earlier, in 1486–1487.

Moreover, the paintings benefit from the strong influence of works by Leonardo da Vinci, particularly the National Gallery's version of the Virgin of the Rocks, as indicated by their style and workmanship, but also by the fact that their figures are more consistent in scale of proportion with those of this second version. In fact, both works were most likely created under Leonardo's supervision: the choice of depicting a lira da braccio rather than the more common fiddle may confirm this, the master being described by his biographer Giorgio Vasari in his Vite as an excellent player of the instrument; the existence of technical defects similar to Leonardo's productions (in particular cracks or agglomerates) would also attest to this. (Note: These technical faults are multiple. For example, the different composition of each of the superimposed pigments meant that the paint layers dried at unequal speeds, causing craquelure in some parts of the works (Billinge, Syson & Spring (2011, p. 65)); but these same craquelures were also caused more simply by differences in the thickness of the paint layers (Spring, Marika; Mazzotta, Antonio; Roy, Ashok; Billinge, Rachel; Peggie, David (2011). "Painting Practice in Milan in the 1490s: The Influence of Leonardo" (PDF). National Gallery Technical Bulletin. 32: 78–112, 81.) Another problem common to works by Leonardo or Leonardoeschi is that the chemical reaction between certain pigment components has created small agglomerates, particularly visible on the thinner layers of paint. Billinge, Syson & Spring (2011, p. 62))

In the case of the Angel in Green, his face and head posture (angle formed by the neck and rotation of the head in relation to the shoulders) are very much in the manner of the Florentine master: they are very close to those of the Virgin in the London version of the Virgin of the Rocks; similarly, they are found in John the Evangelist in The Last Supper.

Portraits used as models for the face of the Angel in Green.

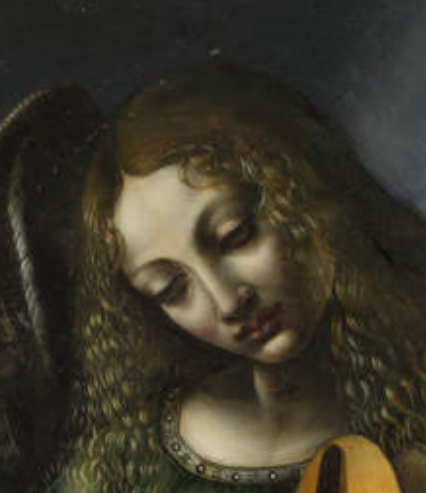
Detail of the face of the angel in green.

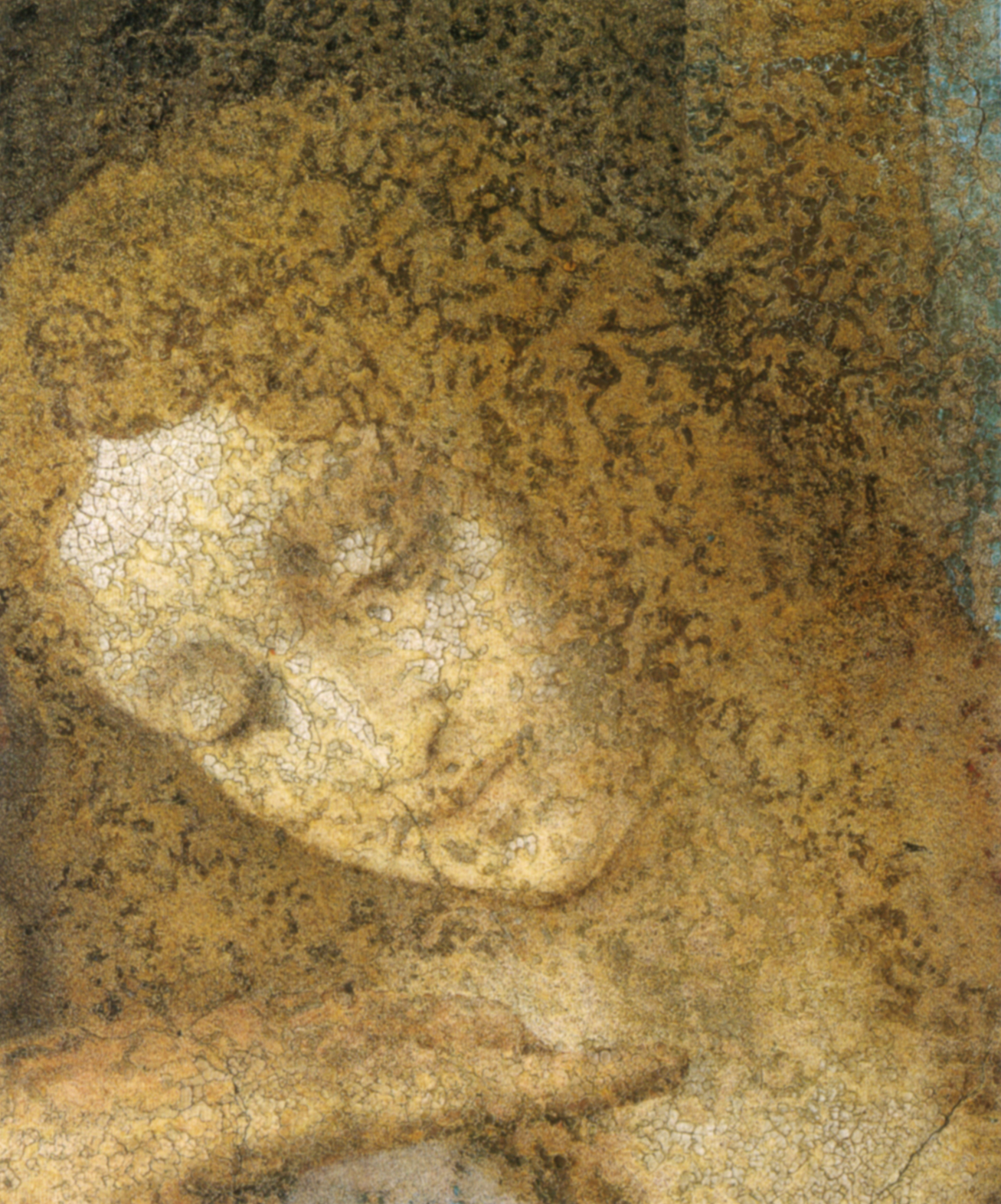
John the Apostle in The Last Supper (detail, Leonardo da Vinci, 1495–1498, Milan, refectory of the convent of the church of Santa Maria delle Grazie).

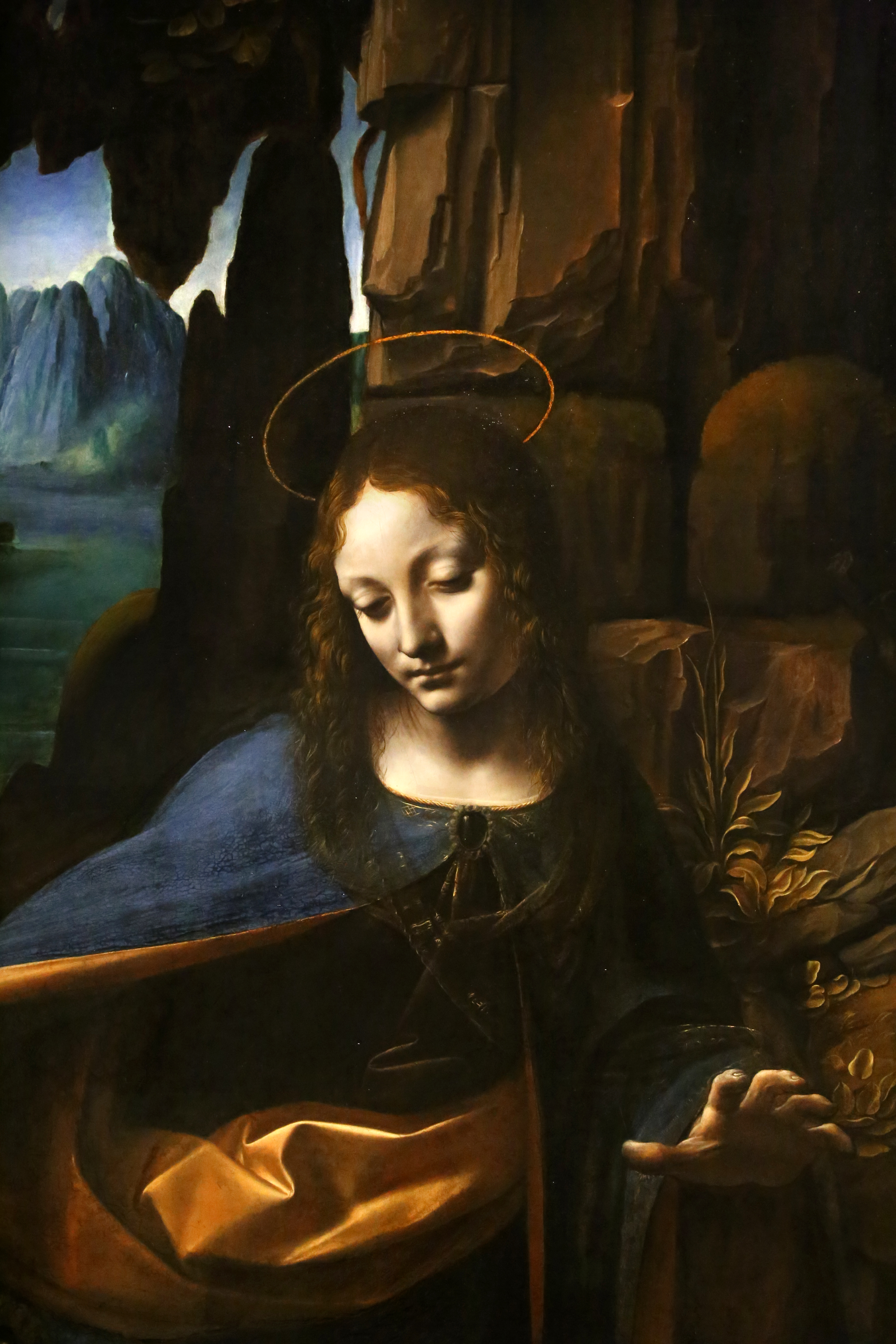
The Virgin from the London version of the Virgin of the Rocks (detail, Leonardo da Vinci, 1491-1499 then 1506–1508, London, National Gallery).

Similarly, according to some authors, the source of inspiration for the portrait of the Angel in Red may be Leonardo da Vinci's portrait of Isabella d'Este: the same profile view of the face profile, identical shoulder position, similar movement of the mass of hair on the head and shoulders, and the same curved fringe on the angel's forehead echoing the outline of a veil, now invisible on the portrait. Finally, the trace of a grid on the preparatory surface of the painting tends to confirm the possibility that the angel's face is a reproduction of an already executed portrait by enlarging the scale, as in the case of Leonardo da Vinci's unfinished painting. Nevertheless, this hypothesis would push back the creation date of the angel in red to after 1500, a date that current research tends to invalidate.

Portrait that may have served as a model
for the face of the Angel in Red.
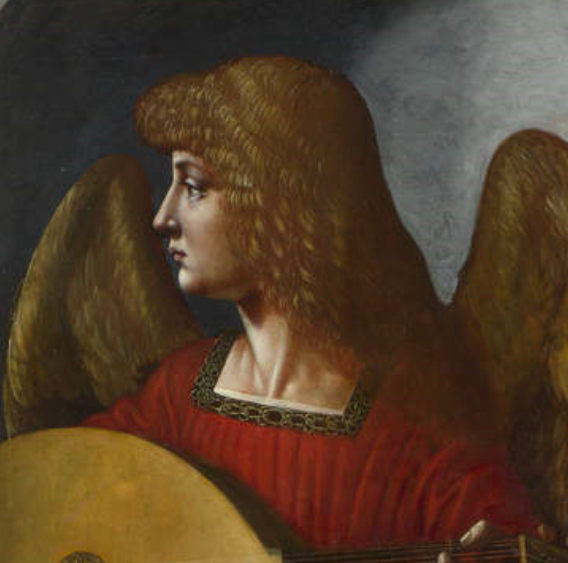
Detail of the angel in red.

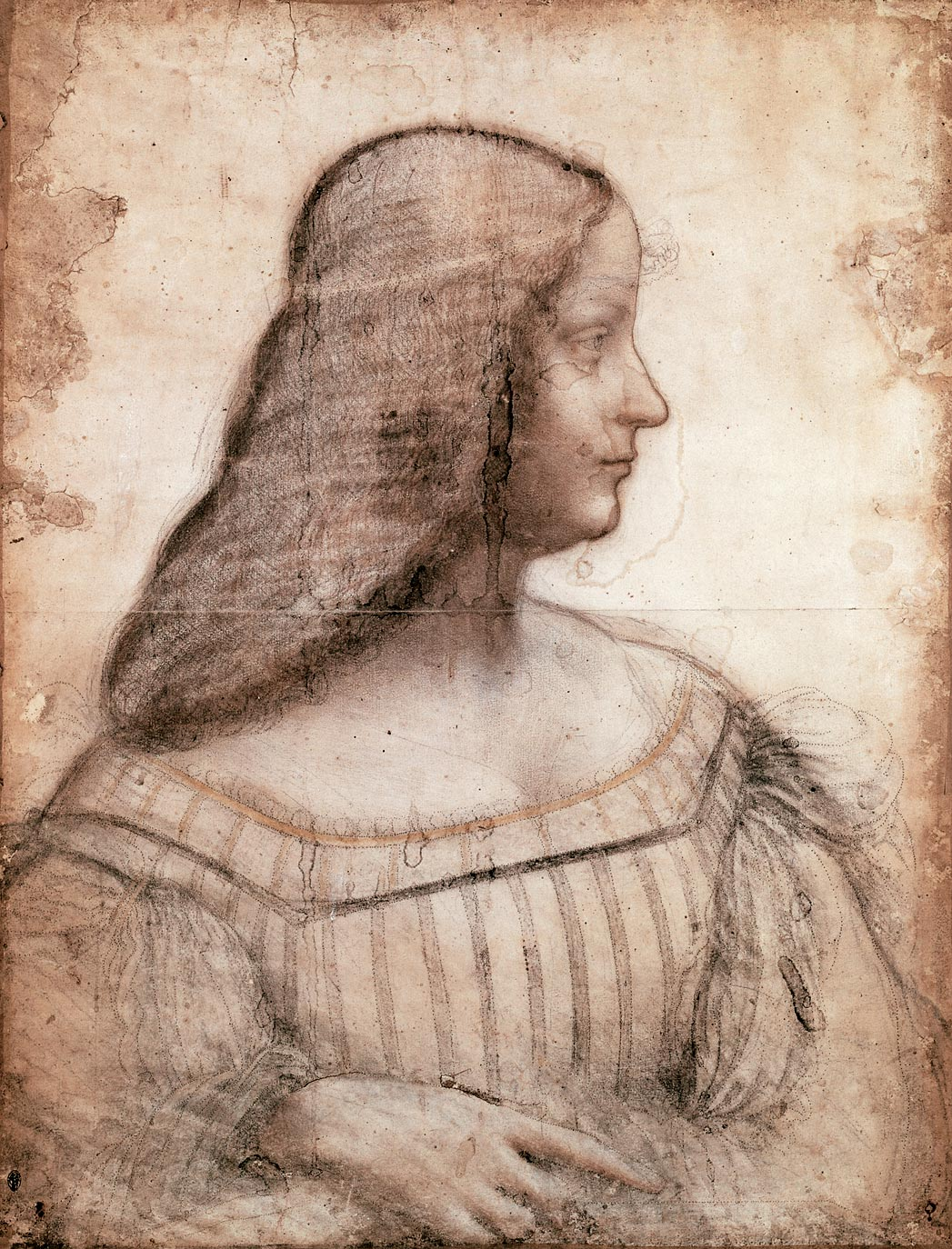
Portrait of Isabella d'Este (Leonardo da Vinci, 1500, Paris, Louvre, inventory no. MI 753).

== Analysis ==
=== Figure treatment ===
Although they most likely benefited from Leonardo da Vinci's assistance, the two painters who created the panels do not stand up to comparison with the master's productions. In contrast to those in the Virgin of the Rocks, the two figures are described as "rigid and angular ", their contours are more pronounced and the drapery of their garments is "stylized and flat": there is a clear contrast between the face of the angel in green and that of his model, the Virgin, with its softer, more subtle shadows, confirming in the latter a greater mastery of the sfumato technique. In fact, both panels are considered by art critics to be less iconographically innovative than the Virgin of the Rocks.

The two figures differ from each other in the colors used, particularly in the rendering of the skin: the tones are warmer in the angel in red than in the angel in green, as the painter is more inclined to use pink-brown and less black than his colleague.

=== A representation within the context of a tradition ===
Examples of representations of angel musicians
in works contemporary with the creation of the panels
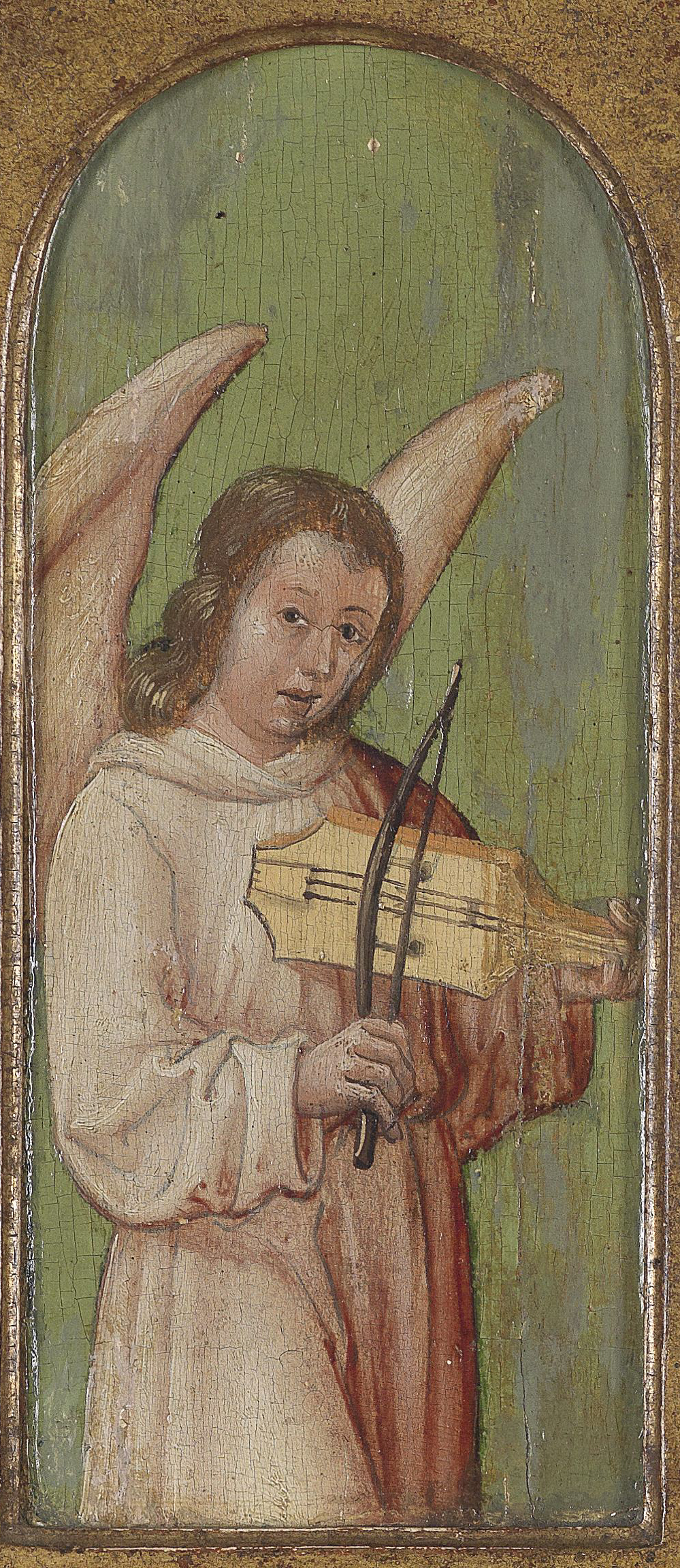
Master Niederdeutscher, Angel playing the fiddle, 15th century.

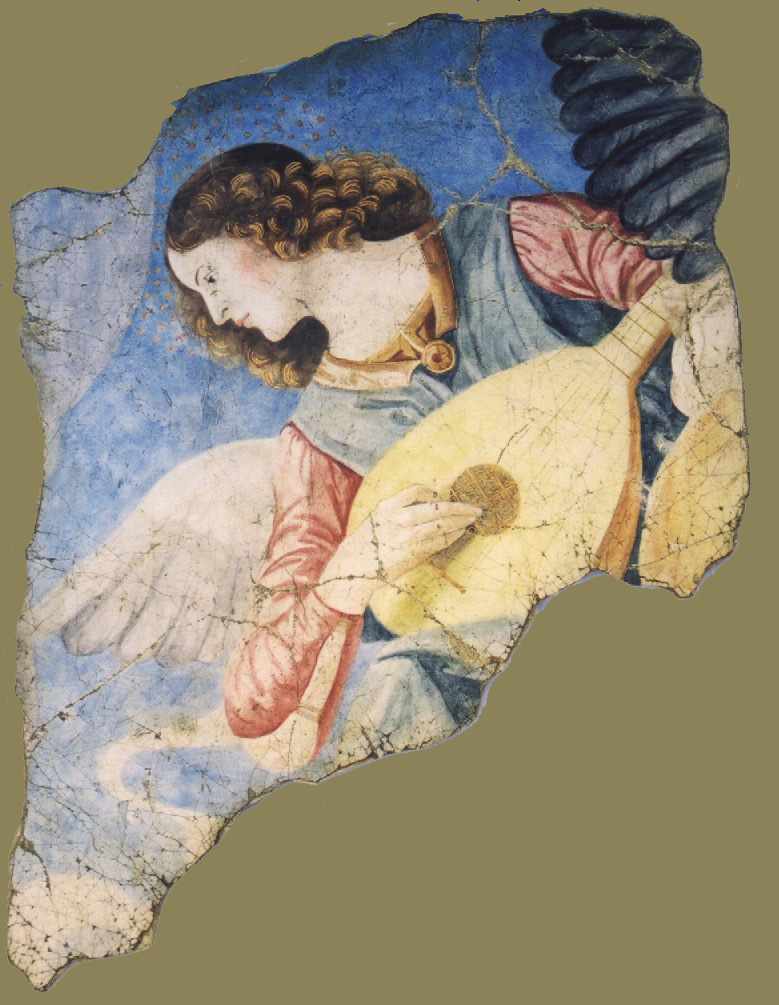
Melozzo de Forlì, An Angel playing the lute, circa 1472, Rome, Pinacoteca Vaticana.

Both paintings feature an angel playing music, in keeping with the tradition of medieval representations of angel musicians. The figure of the angel musician dates back to the 13th century. It has evolved over the centuries to proclaim the glory of an illustrious figure from the Bible, such as the Virgin Mary, Mother of God. Thus, they appear when they concern Mary in the context of significant events in her life: the Annunciation, the Virgin and Child, the Assumption or the Coronation. Among others, the lute and the vielle are privileged instruments, while the lira da braccio is a much rarer instrument.

=== The mystery of the mismatched pair ===
Proposed restoration of the original colors
based on analysis of the deep paint layer.
(The red frame delimits the actual dimensions of each panel).
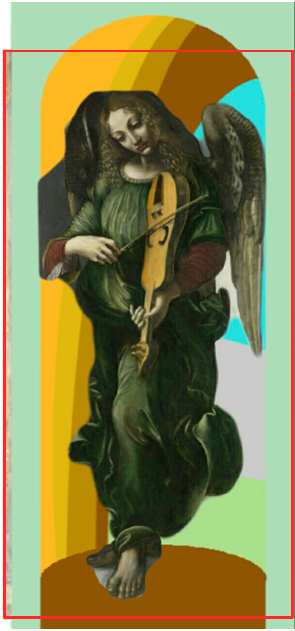
An Angel in Green with a Vielle.

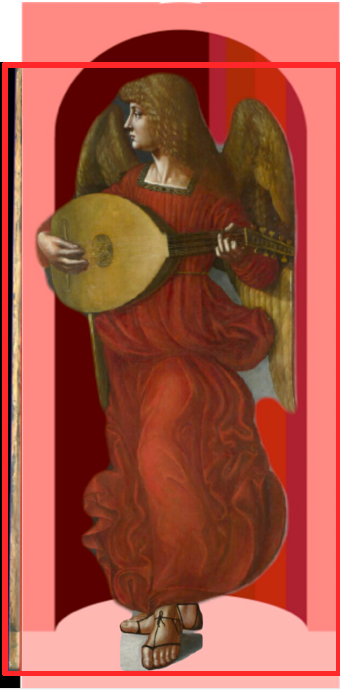
An Angel in Red with a Lute.

Analyses carried out in 1974 and confirmed by a recent study using infrared reflectography show that the panels have undergone a profound change in background colors: the Angel in Green with a vielle featured a green-framed bay window in the background, opening onto a landscape of green and blue colors; as for the Angel in Red with a lute, the background formed a reddish niche, certainly imitating stone. However, the works were repainted in gray, probably to unify the colors. Rachel Billinge, Luke Syson and Marika Spring hypothesize that, as the panels overlooked that of the Virgin of the Rocks, the brightness of their hues could not have clashed with it; on the other hand, when moved to either side, the contrast was so blatant that repainting in neutral colors was imperative.

Several questions arise about the particular colors chosen and why they were deemed inappropriate. It may be, as art historians at the National Gallery have suggested, that this choice of colors provides insight into the arrangement of the panels above the Virgin of the Rocks. Finally, the latest research raises more questions than it provides answers.

== Posterity ==
Certainly considered minor works at the time of their creation, the two panels of the Angel musicians did not enjoy the same fortune as the panel they framed: they are therefore the subject of only one known copy, within the framework of the one meticulously executed on the Virgin of the Rocks by Andrea Bianchi, known as "il Vespino", and dated circa 1611–1614. However, it is possible that a second copy existed in the church of Santa Maria della Passione in Milan. In any case, these two only copies are now considered to have disappeared.

== See also ==
- Italian Renaissance
- Italian Renaissance painting
- The Altarpiece in the Chapel of the Immaculate Conception
