= Giovanni Ambrogio de Predis =

Italian painter (c. 1455 – c. 1508)

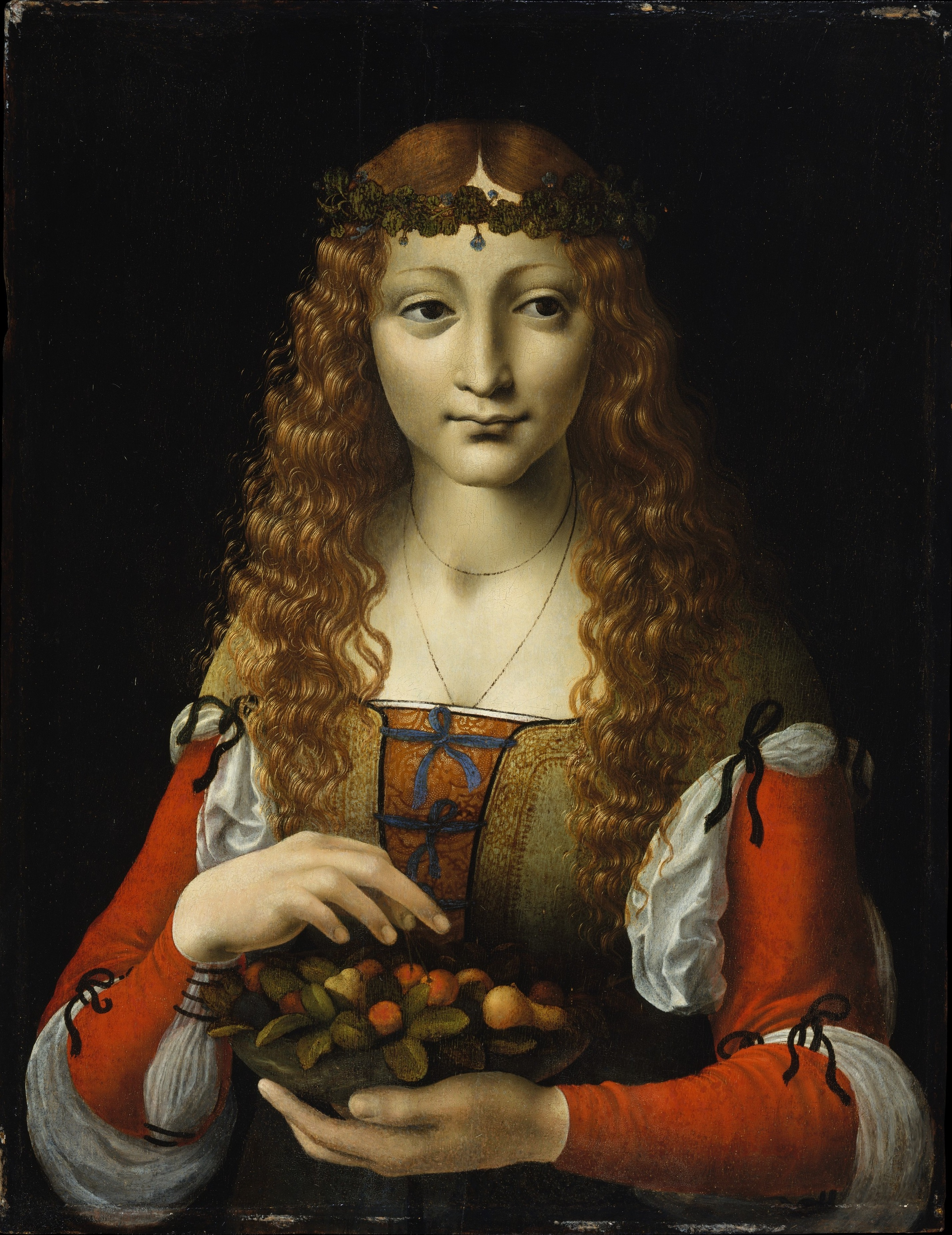
Girl with Cherries, c. 1491–1495

Giovanni Ambrogio de Predis (c. 1455 – c. 1508) was an Italian Renaissance painter, illuminator and designer of coins active in Milan. Ambrogio gained a reputation as a portraitist, including as a painter of miniatures, at the court of Ludovico Sforza.

== Life ==
Ambrogio de Predis was born in a family of artists from Lombardy. His brothers and half-brothers including Evangelista, Bernardino and Cristoforo were also painters.

Little is known about his training. He initially worked as an illuminator in collaboration with his half-brother Cristoforo. He produced seven miniatures for a Book of Hours in 1472 (the work no longer exists) and again for a Book of Hours in 1474. He then worked on designs for the local mint in Milan along with his brother Bernardino. He subsequently worked for the court of the Sforzas for a number of years, mainly as a portrait painter. It is during this time that he offered hospitality to Leonardo da Vinci when he arrived in Milan.

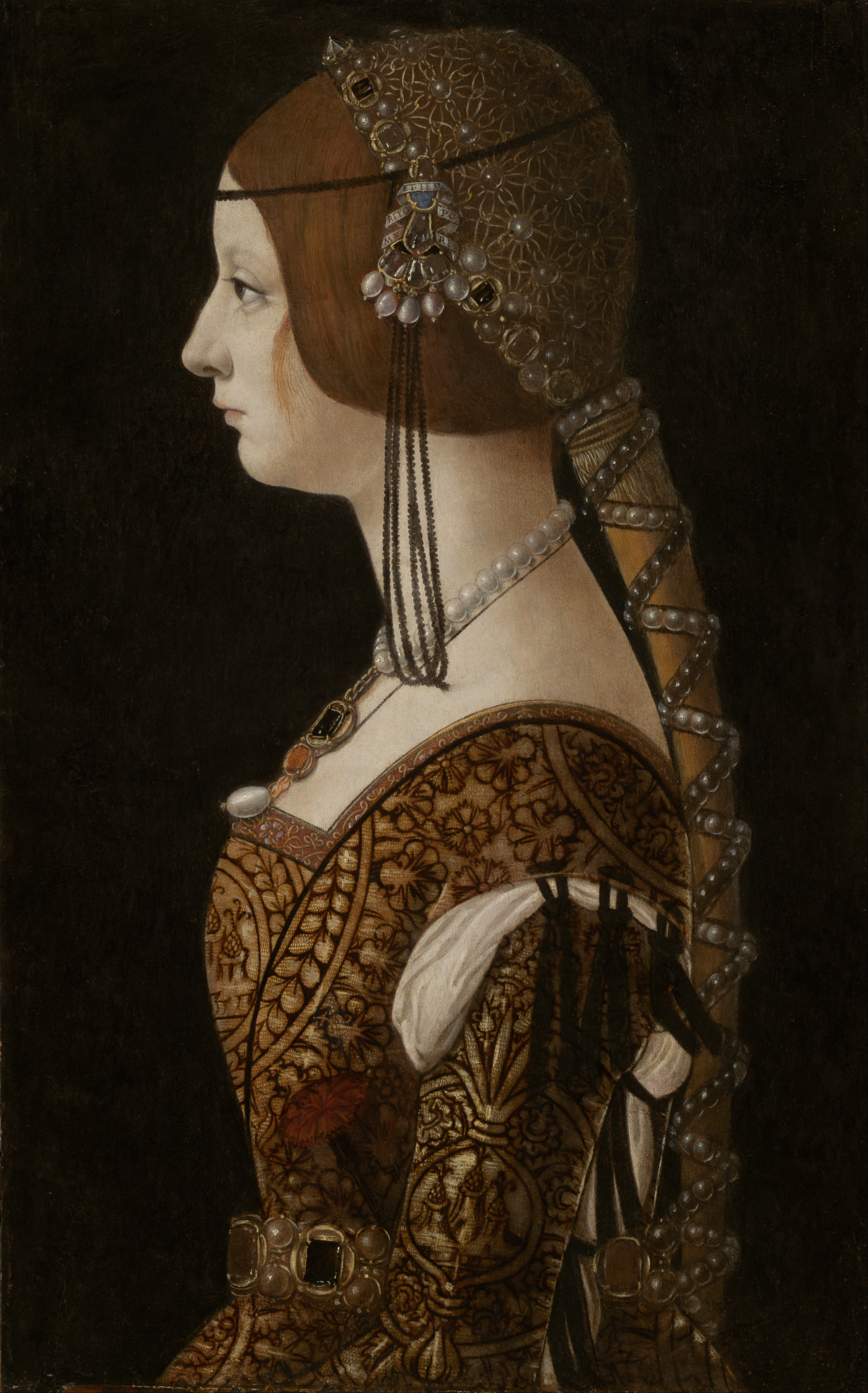
Bianca Maria Sforza, probably 1493

A marriage was arranged between Emperor Maximilian I and Bianca Maria Sforza, niece of Ludovico il Moro, but before the former would commit to the arrangement, he requested a portrait of his proposed bride. The portrait of Bianca Maria was painted by Ambrogio, who followed her to Innsbruck after the wedding in 1493, and there he worked for several years in the lady's service before returning to Milan, where he designed coins for the mint, designed and supervised tapestry works, and prepared stage scenery. In 1502 he produced his only surviving signed and dated work, a portrait of the Emperor Maximilian. Much of Ambrogio de Predis's artistic output remains in dispute.

== Work ==
He and his brother Evangelista are known to have collaborated with Leonardo da Vinci on the painting of the Virgin of the Rocks for the altarpiece in the chapel of the Confraternity of the Immaculate Conception at the Church of San Francesco Grande, Milan. Leonardo painted the central panel with the Virgin of the Rocks (National Gallery, London), while the two brothers created the side panels. The side panels for the Virgin of the Rocks, now in the National Gallery, London were stated by the brothers to have been painted by them during the legal dispute over the altarpiece, and this is accepted by art historians.

== Cultural references ==
In Canto XLV of Ezra Pound's The Cantos, Pound denounces usury and tells what usury contradicts and what can be accomplished without it by juxtaposing historical figures of the humanist movement and the Renaissance: "Came not by usura Angelico; came not Ambrogio Praedis, came no church of cut stone signed: Adamo me fecit."

Paintings by Giovanni Ambrogio de Predis

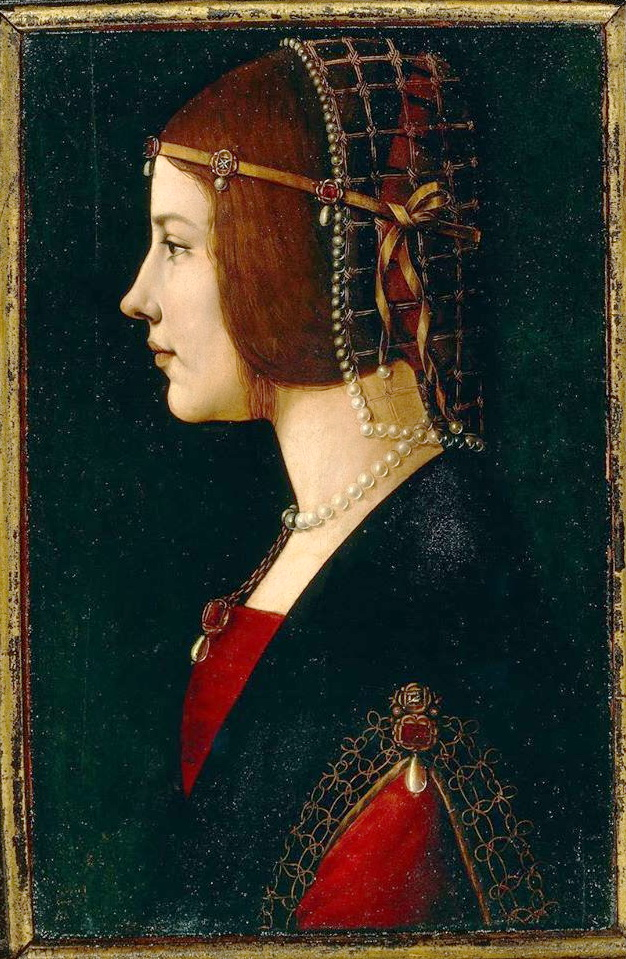
Portrait of a Lady (sitter's identity not established, possibly Beatrice d'Este)

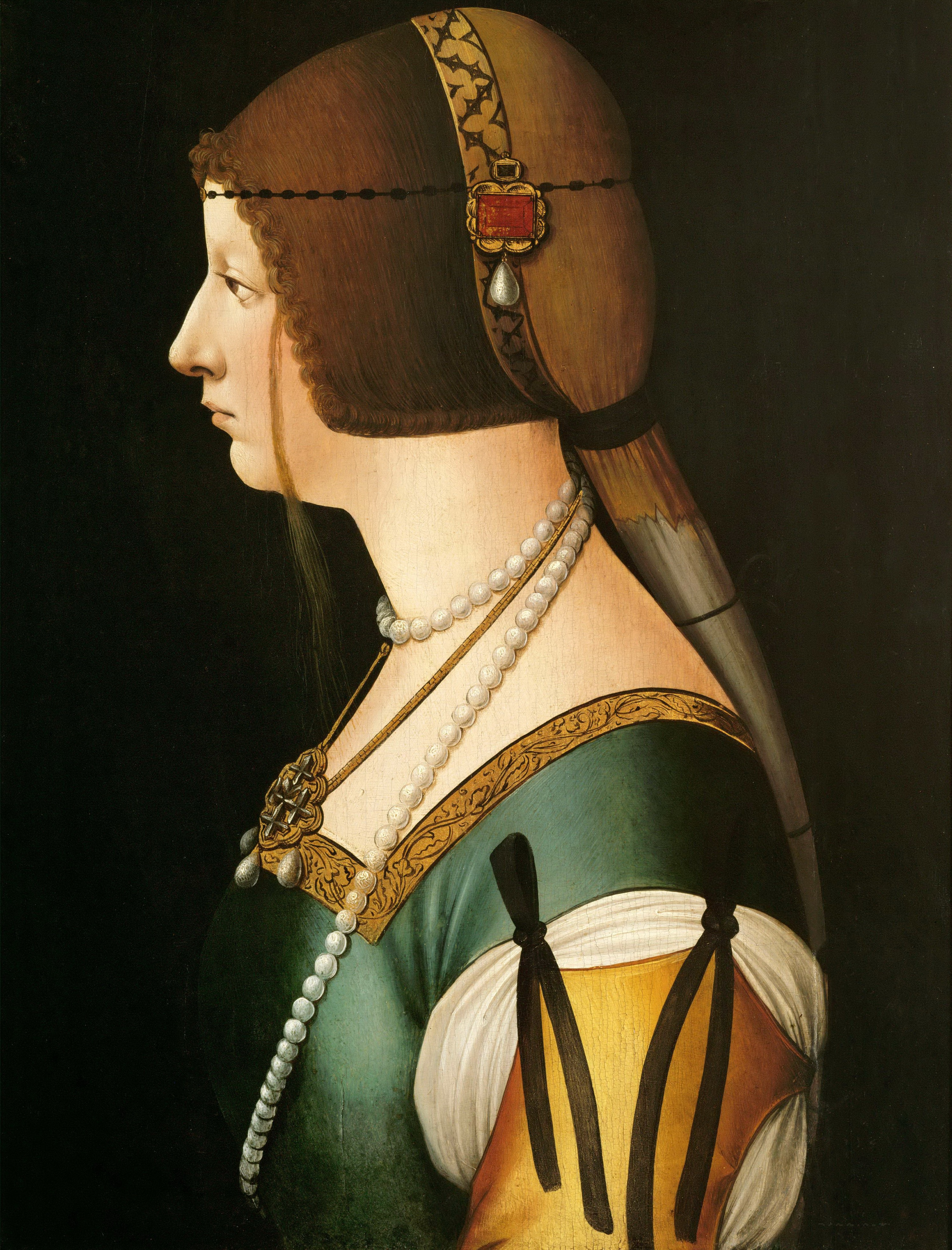
Empress Bianca Maria (1493)

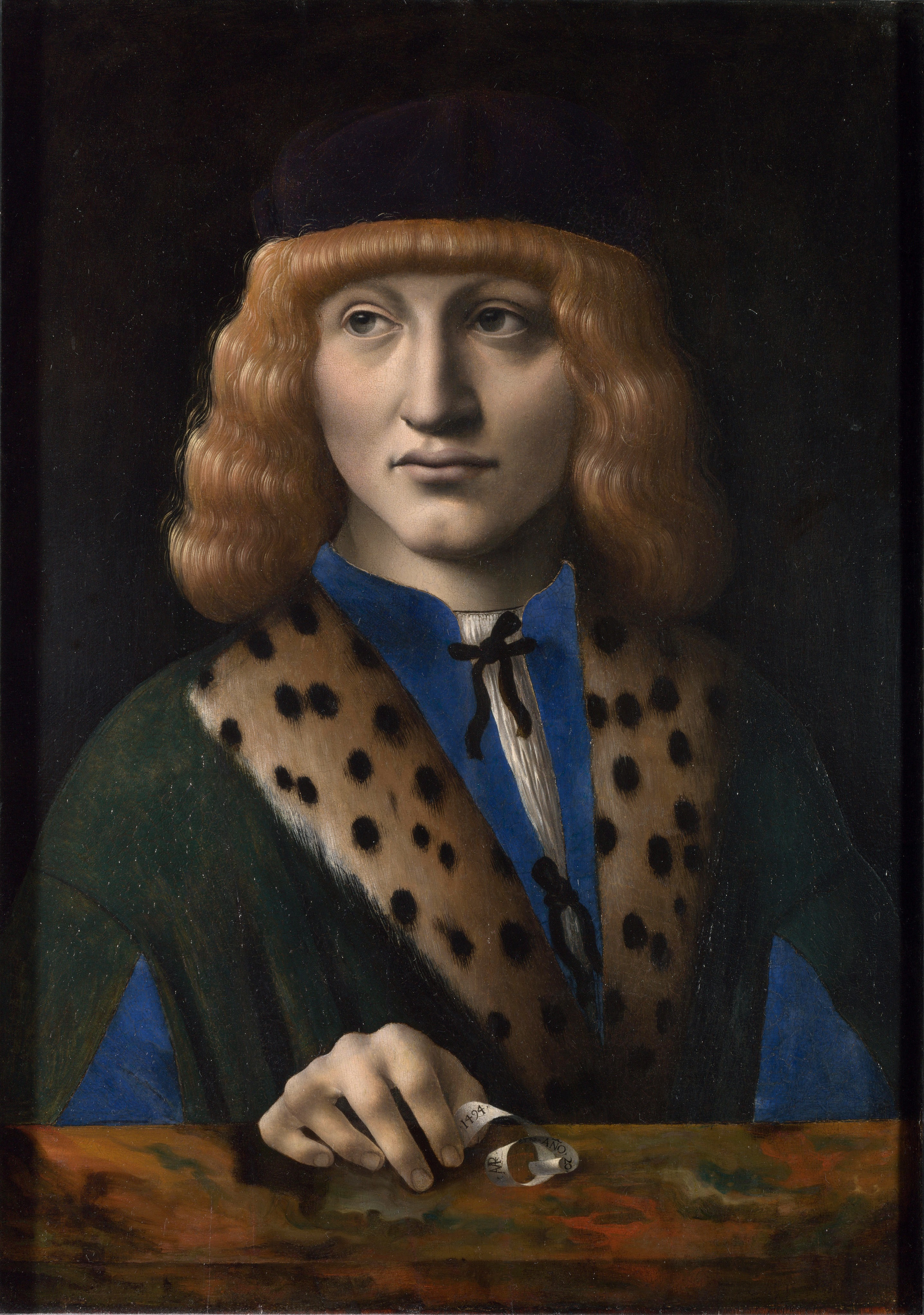
The Archinto Portrait (National Gallery, London), 1494

Angel playing lute

Alleged portrait of Gian Galeazzo Maria Sforza as Saint Sebastian

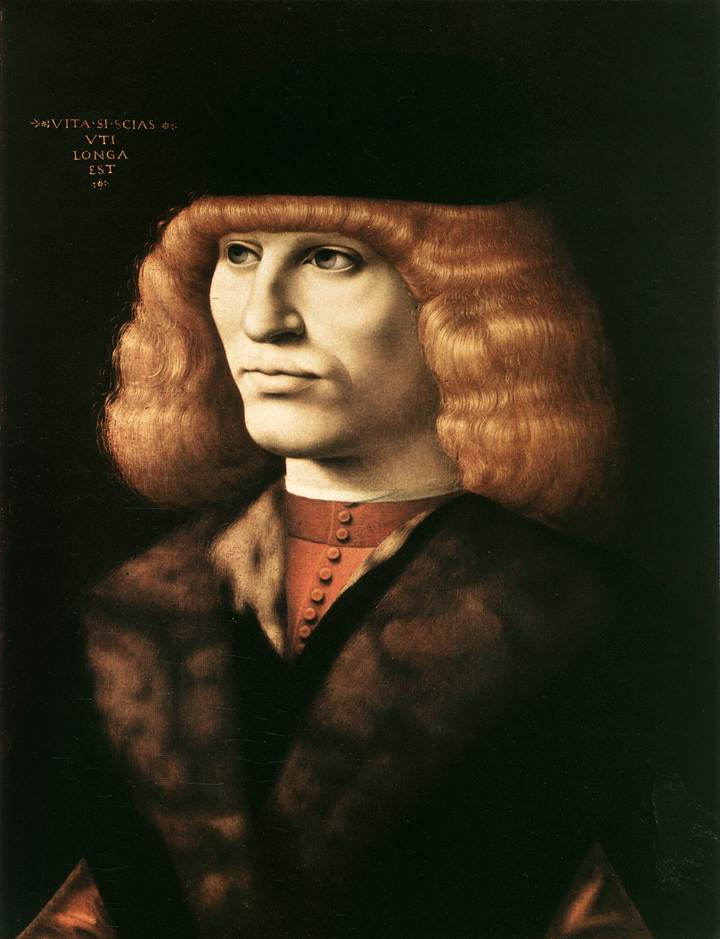
Portrait of a Young Man, circa 1500

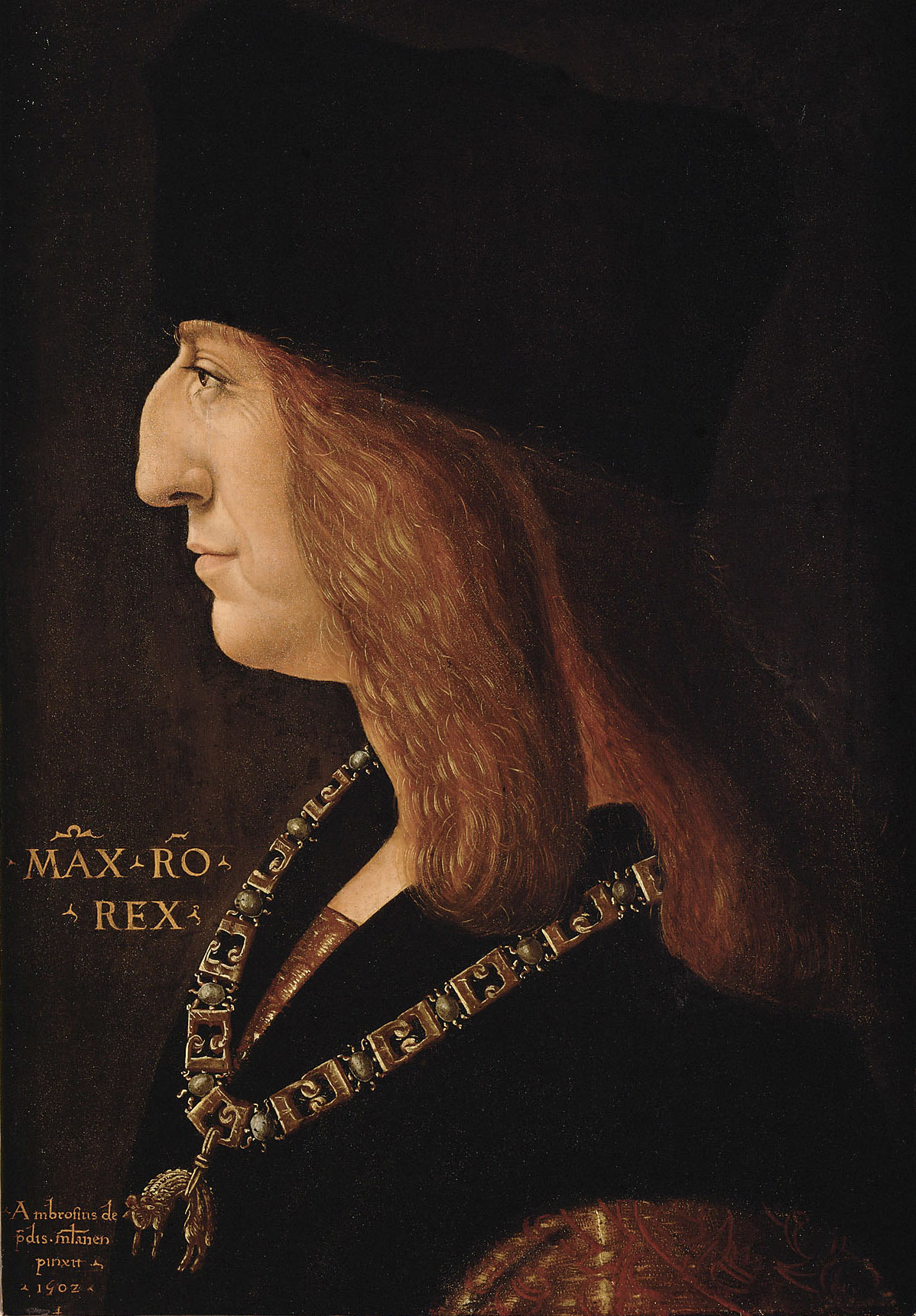
Emperor Maximilian I (1502)

== See also ==
- The Altarpiece in the Chapel of the Immaculate Conception
- Tête d'enfant de trois quarts à droite
