= San Costantino =

San Costantino may refer to:

- San Costantino Albanese, town and comune in the province of Potenza, in the Southern Italian region of Basilicata
- San Costantino Calabro, municipality in the Province of Vibo Valentia in the Italian region Calabria
