= Costantino Affer =

Italian medallist (1906–1987)

Costantino Affer (1906–1987) was an Italian medallist and miniaturist.

== Early life ==
Affer was born in 1906 in Milan. He studied fine arts at the then Scuola di Brera in Milan, known today as Accademia di Belle Arti di Brera. His area of interests included engraving and sculpture.

== Career ==
Affer started exhibiting his works in 1940. Following the end of World War II, in the early 1950s, he focused on medallic art. He was for many years the artistic director of the art of Lorioli Fratelli, a Milan-based company specialized in producing medals of all kinds for all purposes. Under Affer's direction, they later expanded their activities to busts and reliefs for public buildings. In 1955 Affer was commissioned to design the official medals for the 1956 Winter Olympics in Cortina d'Ampezzo in the Dolomites. His many works of art can be found in museums and private collections.

Affer died in 1987 in Milan.
