= Normando Costantino =

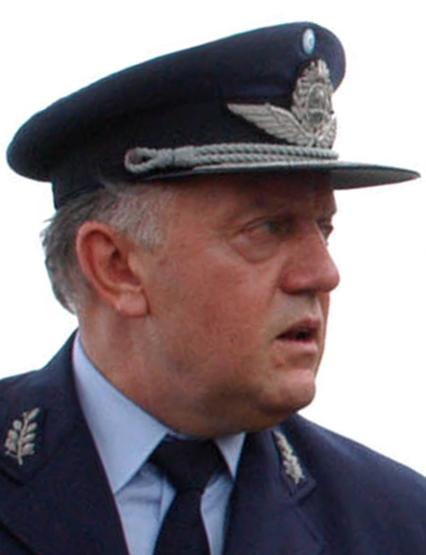
- Brigadier General Normando Costantino
- Born: 1952 (age 73–74)
- Military career
- Allegiance: Argentina
- Branch: Argentine Air Force
- Rank: Brigadier General (equivalent to 3-star or 4-star rank)

Brigadier General Normando Costantino (born 1952) is a former Chief of the General Staff of the Argentine Air Force. He has a degree in Air and Space Systems.

== Early life ==
Costantino was born on March 18, 1952, in Rio Cuarto, where his father was the mayor and his mother a dancer.

== Career ==
Costantino is a veteran of the 1982 Falklands War (Spanish: Guerra de las Malvinas), where he fought as an A-4C Skyhawk pilot although his only two missions were aborted (one because a VHF radio problem and the other an aerial refueling failure from the KC-130 Hercules)

In November 2006, he was appointed as the overall commander of the Air Force following Eduardo Schiaffino's dismissal by the senior Argentine political leadership.

In July 2013, he was replaced by Mario Miguel Callejo.

Military offices
Preceded by Eduardo Schiaffino	Chief of the General Staff of the Argentine Air Force; 2006 - 2013	Succeeded by Mario Miguel Callejo
