= Costantino Fiaschetti =

Italian architect

- Occupation: Architect

Costantino Fiaschetti was an 18th-century Roman architect. He is mostly known today for the Fountain in the Piazza del Mercato in Spoleto, designed by him in 1746.
