= Marian blue =

Shade of blue

Common connotations
- Virgin Mary

Color coordinates
- Hex triplet: #2B4593
- sRGB^{B} (r, g, b): (43, 69, 147)
- HSV (h, s, v): (225°, 71%, 58%)
- CIELCh_{uv} (L, C, h): (32, 64, 260°)
- Source: Color Name: Marian Blue
- B: Normalized to [0–255] (byte)

Marian blue is a tone of the color ultramarine named for its use with the Virgin Mary.

== Background ==
In paintings, Mary is traditionally portrayed in blue. This tradition can trace its origin to the Byzantine Empire, from c. AD 500, when blue was "the color of an empress". A more practical explanation for the use of this color is that in Medieval and Renaissance Europe, the blue pigment was derived from the rock lapis lazuli, a stone imported from Afghanistan of greater value than gold. Beyond a painter's retainer, patrons were expected to purchase any gold or lapis lazuli to be used in the painting. Hence, it was an expression of devotion and glorification to swathe the Virgin in gowns of blue. Transformations in visual depictions of the Virgin from the 13th to 15th centuries mirror her "social" standing within Christianity as well as in wider society.

In art the association of blue with Mary was complemented by an association of red with Jesus. The juxtaposition of the two is an important element in many works of historical art.

== See also ==
- List of colors
- Mariology
