= Costantino De Giacomo =

Costantino De Giacomo Graduated with honours in Medicine and Surgery at the University of Pavia in 1980.

He received the following specializations: Paediatrics (University of Pavia, 1984) and Gastroenterology and Digestive Endoscopy (University of Pavia, 1988).

From 2002 to 2004, he was Vice President of the Italian Society of Gastroenterology, Hepatology and Nutrition Pediatric (SIGENP).

As part of the Pediatric Gastroenterology main field of interest was the study of upper gastrointestinal ulcer disease. He is the author of over 250 publications, covering the clinical, epidemiological and therapeutic approaches to gastroduodenitis and peptic ulcer, with special emphasis on the role of Helicobacter pylori. Other fields of study were chronic hepatitis, malabsorption syndromes and among these, the allergy to cow's milk protein and gluten-sensitive enteropathy, the gastroesophageal reflux disease and inflammatory bowel diseases.

== Publications ==
De Giacomo, Costantino (1999). Gastroenterologia, epatologia e nutrizione. Utet Division Scienze Mediche. p. 242. ISBN 9788879331449.
