= Costantino D'Orazio =

Italian art critic and curator

- Born: 1974 (age 51–52); Rome, Italy
- Occupation: Art critic

Costantino D'Orazio (born 1 June 1974) is an Italian art critic and curator. He was director of GNU (Umbria's National Gallery) in Perugia/Italy.

== Expositions ==
D'Orazio worked on many exhibitions and artistic installations, including:

- Mario Merz. Un segno nel Foro di Cesare (Rome, 2003)
- Mimmo Paladino a Villa Pisani (Villa Pisani, Stra, 2008)
- Intorno a Borromini (Rome, 2009)
- Speranze & Dubbi. Arte giovane tra Italia e Libano (Beirut, 2008 and Turin, 2009)
- I Classici del Contemporaneo (Villa Pisani, Stra, 2009)
- Oliviero Rainaldi – Tutto Scorre (Villa Pisani, Stra, 2011).

== Bibliography ==
- Costantino D'Orazio (2008). Mimmo Paladino a Villa Pisani (in Italian). Marsilio Editori.
- Costantino D'Orazio and Mario Merz (2010). Speranze e dubbi. Arte giovane in Italia (in Italian). Hopefulmonster.
- Costantino D'Orazio, Ludovico Pratesi and Giorgio Verzotti (2003). Giuseppe Penone. Paesaggi del cervello (in Italian). Hopefulmonster.
- Costantino D'Orazio and Ludovico Pratesi (2004). Mario Merz, Domenico Bianchi (in Italian). Hopefulmonster.
- Costantino D'Orazio (2010). The Keys to Open 99 Secret Places in Rome. Palombi Editori.
- Costantino D'Orazio and Francesco Buranelli (2011). Oliviero Rainaldi. Tutto scorre (in Italian). Marsilio.
- Costantino D'Orazio (2011). Le chiavi per aprire 99 luoghi segreti d'Italia (in Italian). Palombi Editori.
- Costantino D'Orazio (2011). Ritratti Romani. Chi ha costruito Roma, come e perché (in Italian). Palombi Editori.
- Costantino D'Orazio (2013). Caravaggio segreto (in Italian). Sperling & Kupfer.
- Costantino D'Orazio (2014). The great beauty of Rome. Sperling & Kupfer.
- Costantino D'Orazio (2014). Leonardo segreto (in Italian). Sperling & Kupfer.
- Costantino D'Orazio (2014). La Roma segreta del film La Grande Bellezza (in Italian). Sperling & Kupfer.
- Costantino D'Orazio (2015). Andare per ville e palazzi (in Italian). Il Mulino.
- Costantino D'Orazio (2015). Raffaello segreto (in Italian). Sperling & Kupfer.
- Costantino D'Orazio (2016). Michelangelo. Io sono fuoco (in Italian). Sperling & Kupfer.
- Costantino D'Orazio (2017). Ma liberaci dal male (in Italian). Sperling & Kupfer.
- Costantino D'Orazio (2017). Mercanti di bellezza (in Italian). RAI Eri.
- Costantino D'Orazio (2018). L'Arte in sei emozioni (in Italian). Editori Laterza.
- Costantino D'Orazio (2019). Leonardo svelato. I segreti nascosti nei suoi capolavori (in Italian). Sperling & Kupfer.
- Costantino D'Orazio (2019). Il mistero van Gogh (in Italian). Sperling & Kupfer.
