= Borgognone =

Borgognone or Bergognone is a surname. Notable people with the surname include:

- Ambrogio Bergognone (1470–1523), Italian painter
- Bernardino Bergognone (1455/60–1525), Italian painter
- Dirk Borgognone (born 1968), former National Football League placekicker
- Guillaume Courtois (1628–1679), French painter active in Italy
- Jacques Courtois (1621–c.1676), French painter active in Italy
