= Bernardino Bergognone =

Italian painter

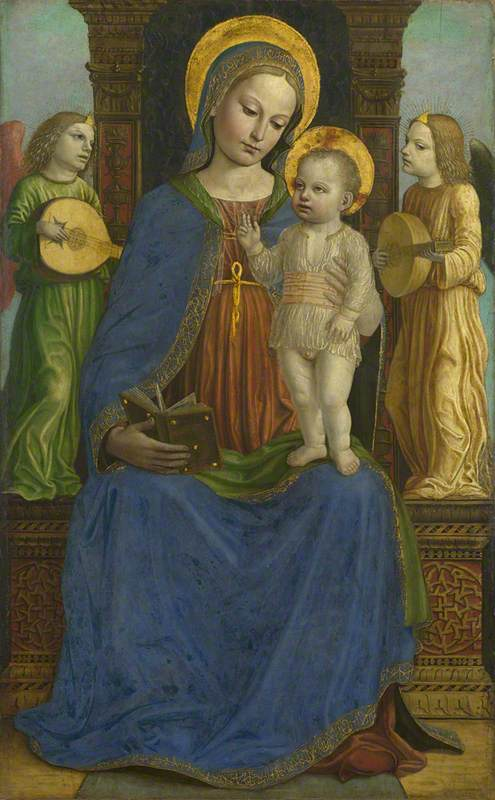
The Virgin and Child with Two Angels, between 1490 and 1495

Bernardino Borgognone (1455/60–1525) was an Italian Renaissance painter of the Milanese school.

Bernardino grew up and worked in the Lombardy region. He was the chief assistant to his brother and fellow painter Ambrogio Bergognone on important projects in Lombardy in the 1490s. Their use of mordant (the adhesive to which the gold leaf is attached) gilding in their art is distinctive. Bernardino's style of painting appears influenced by fellow Lombard painter Vincenzo Foppa.

The National Gallery, London, has one of his works: The Virgin and Child with Two Angels. The name Bernardino can be read on the hem of the Virgin's mantle. This work shows stylistic similarities with his brother Ambrogio at the time of their collaboration at the Certosa di Pavia, composed of the church and convent of the Carthusians. He worked there with his brother furnishing the designs of the figures of the virgin, saints and apostles for the choir-stalls, executed in tarsia or inlaid wood work by Bartolomeo Pola.
