= Eastern Orthodox opposition to papal supremacy =

The Eastern Orthodox Church is opposed to the Catholic dogma of papal supremacy. While not denying that primacy does exist for the Bishop of Rome, Eastern Orthodox Christians argue that the tradition of Rome's primacy in the Early Church was not equivalent to the current doctrine of supremacy.

== Eastern Orthodox understanding of Catholicity ==
The test of authentic catholicity is adherence to the authority of the Church's Holy Tradition, and then to the witness of Sacred "Scripture", which is itself a product of the Church's aforementioned Holy Tradition. It is not defined by adherence to any particular see. It is the position of the Eastern Orthodox Church that it has never accepted the pope as de jure leader of the entire church. All bishops are equal "as Peter", therefore every church under every bishop (consecrated in apostolic succession) is fully complete (the original meaning of catholic).

Referring to Ignatius of Antioch, Carlton says:

Contrary to popular opinion, the word catholic does not mean "universal"; it means "whole, complete, lacking nothing." ... Thus, to confess the Church to be catholic is to say that She possesses the fullness of the Christian faith. To say, however, that Orthodox and Rome constitute "two lungs" of the same Church is to deny that either Church separately is catholic in any meaningful sense of the term. This is not only contrary to the teaching of Orthodoxy, it is flatly contrary to the teaching of the Roman Catholic Church, which considered itself truly catholic.

The church is in the image of the Trinity and reflects the reality of the incarnation.

The body of Christ must always be equal with itself ... The local church which manifests the body of Christ cannot be subsumed into any larger organisation or collectivity which makes it more catholic and more in unity, for the simple reason that the principle of total catholicity and total unity is already intrinsic to it.

Any changes to the understanding of the church would reflect a change in the understanding of the Trinity.

== Eastern Orthodox rebuttal of Catholic arguments ==
It is the position of Orthodox Christianity that Roman Catholic arguments in support of the teaching have relied on proofs from Fathers that have either been misinterpreted or so taken out of context as to misrepresent their true intent. It is the position of Orthodox Christianity that a closer examination of those supposed supports would have the effect of either not supporting the argument or have the opposite effect of supporting the counter-argument.

=== Apostolic Throne ===
Athanasius is used as a witness for papal primacy on numerous Catholic apologist sites.

Rome is called the Apostolic throne.

Whelton however says that Athanasius does not use the definite article (the) in the text.

Thus from the first they spared not even Liberius, Bishop of Rome, but extended their fury even to those parts; they respected not his bishopric, because it was an Apostolical throne ...

Rome is an Apostolic throne, not the Apostolic throne.

=== Pope Leo XIII ===
And for a like reason St. Augustine publicly attests that "the primacy of the Apostolic chair always existed in the Roman Church" (Ep. xliii., n. 7)

=== Augustine ===
...because he saw himself united by letters of communion both to the Roman Church, in which the supremacy of an apostolic chair has always flourished.

Whelton goes on to say that for Augustine there is not one Apostolic See, but many:

You cannot deny that you see what we call heresies and schisms, that is, many cut off from the root of the Christian society, which by means of the Apostolic Sees, and the successions of bishops, is spread abroad in an indisputably world-wide diffusion ...

=== Ignatius of Antioch ===
For Ignatius each church under a bishop is complete – the original meaning of "catholic". For Ignatius the church is a world-wide unity of many communities. Each has at its center a bishop "who draws together the local community in the Eucharistic celebration." This then is the unity of the church – each church united to its bishop – each of these churches united to each other. There is no evidence of him accepting a single supreme bishop-of-bishops as the bishop's authority is localised to a particular church. C. Carlton sums up Ignatius's view of the bishop's role in the Church this way:

Just as the Father is the principal of unity within the Holy Trinity, so the bishop is the center of the visible unity of the Church on earth.

Ignatius sets out what he believes consists of the church in an epistle to the Trallians:

In like manner, let all reverence the deacons as an appointment of Jesus Christ, and the bishop as Jesus Christ, who is the Son of the Father, and the presbyters as the Sanhedrin of God, and assembly of the apostles. Apart from these, there is no Church.

There is no reference to another tier above bishop. For Ignatius, the bishop is supreme, not the bishop because he is in communion with the bishop in Rome.

Thus when he writes to Polycarp, the bishop of Smyrna, he states that God is Polycarp’s bishop, implying that there is no intermediary between the local bishop and God.

John Chrysostom referred to Ignatius of Antioch as a "teacher equivalent to Peter".

=== Letter to the Romans ===
Ignatius' Epistle to the Romans is used by Catholic apologists to suggest Roman primacy. In particular his opening remarks:

Ignatius, who is also called Theophorus, to the Church which has obtained mercy, through the majesty of the Most High Father, and Jesus Christ, His only-begotten Son; the Church which is beloved and enlightened by the will of Him that willeth all things which are according to the love of Jesus Christ our God, which also presides in the place of the region of the Romans, worthy of God, worthy of honour, worthy of the highest happiness, worthy of praise, worthy of obtaining her every desire, worthy of being deemed holy, and which presides over love, is named from Christ, and from the Father, which I also salute in the name of Jesus Christ, the Son of the Father: to those who are united, both according to the flesh and spirit, to every one of His commandments; who are filled inseparably with the grace of God, and are purified from every strange taint, [I wish] abundance of happiness unblameably, in Jesus Christ our God.

J.H. Srawley concedes that the Roman church presides but argues that it is unclear as to what area the act of presiding ("presides in the place of the region of the Romans" and "presides over love") refers to. He argues that the act of presiding may be simply of those churches in the region of the Romans, that is, those in Italy.

=== Tome of Leo ===
Often cited as a proof of Papal Supremacy is the Tome of Leo which is a letter sent by Pope Leo to the Fourth Ecumenical Council, Chalcedon in 451. It in part seems to suggest that Leo speaks with the authority of Peter. It is the position of Orthodox Christianity that the approval of the Tome is simply to state a unity of faith, not only of the pope but other churchmen as well. Before the Tome of Leo was presented to the Council, it was submitted to a committee headed by Patriarch St. Anatolius of Constantinople for study. The committee compared the Tome of Leo to the 12 Anathemas of St. Cyril of Alexandria against Nestorius and declared the Tome orthodox. It was then presented to the council for approval.

After reading of the foregoing epistle (Pope Leo's), the most reverend bishops cried out: "This is the faith of the fathers, this is the faith of the Apostles. So we all believe, thus the orthodox believe. Anathema to him who does not thus believe. Peter has spoken thus through Leo. So taught the Apostles. Piously and truly did Leo teach, so taught Cyril. Everlasting be the memory of Cyril. Leo and Cyril taught the same thing, anathema to him who does not so believe. This is the true faith. Those of us who are orthodox thus believe".

However it is not just Leo's teaching that is the teaching of the Apostle, but Cyril's teaching as well. Both teach as Peter. The same language was used following the reading of Cyril's letter at the council. The language of the council is simply to reinforce that all believe. At the Third Ecumenical Council Pope Celestine and Cyril were compared to Paul.

=== John Chrysostom ===
Another apparent witness for supremacy claims is John Chrysostom. This evidence is supposed to be based on an incident when he faced exile and he appealed to the pope for help. When he was to be exiled he appealed to the pope for help, as well as two other western prelates; Venerius of Milan and Chromatius of Aquileia. He appealed to all three in the same terms rather than viewing the pope as leader.

In 2007 Pope Benedict XVI also spoke of this:

How well known and highly esteemed Chromatius was in the Church of his time we can deduce from an episode in the life of St John Chrysostom. When the Bishop of Constantinople was exiled from his See, he wrote three letters to those he considered the most important Bishops of the West seeking to obtain their support with the Emperors: he wrote one letter to the Bishop of Rome, the second to the Bishop of Milan and the third to the Bishop of Aquileia, precisely, Chromatius (Ep. CLV: PG LII, 702).

Historian J. N. D Kelly wrote:

While confined to his palace, John took a step of great importance. At some date between Easter and Pentecost ... he wrote for support to the pope, Innocent I, and, in identical terms, to the two other leading patriarchs in the west, Venerius of Milan and Chromatius of Aquileia ... His move in no way implied that he recognized the holy see as the supreme court of appeal in the church ... Such an idea, absent from his sermons and other writings, is ruled out by his simultaneous approach to the two other western patriarchs.

The pope took up the cause of John Chrysostom, convoking a western synod to investigate the matter. They found in favor of John Chrysostom and sent delegates to Constantinople but these were ignored and sent back after only three months. The pope's findings in support of John Chrysostom were not viewed as serious enough to annul John Chrysostom's exile.

It must also be remembered that he took his vows from Meletius (whom we noted earlier was not in communion with Rome). He accepted as an authority men not in communion with Rome. After Meletius died John Chrysostom accepted Flavian as his bishop – another person not in communion with Rome. John Chrysostom spent much of his life not in communion with Rome.

Other texts are used to allege he supported Roman primacy. John Chrysostom sometimes ascribes to Peter greatness.

For he who then did not dare to question Jesus, but committed the office to another, was even entrusted with the chief authority over the brethren.

This would seem to indicate that Chrysostom taught that Peter was the supreme ruler over the "brethren". He goes on to ascribe Peter as the "teacher of the world".

However, according to Abbé Guettée on other occasions John Chrysostom ascribes the same titles to others:

"The merciful God is wont to give this honor to his servants, that by their grace others may acquire salvation; as was agreed by the blessed Paul, that teacher of the world who emitted the rays of his teaching everywhere."

Denny also notes that John Chrysostom goes on to speak of Paul as being on an equal footing with Peter. Further, the Catholic encyclopedia offers this frank admission of his writings:

... that there is no clear and any direct passage in favour of the primacy of the pope.

=== Basil the Great ===
Basil the Great also supported Meletius against Rome's candidate. Writing to Count Terentius Basil said,

But a further rumour has reached me that you are in Antioch, and are transacting the business in hand with the chief authorities. And, besides this, I have heard that the brethren who are of the party of Paulinus are entering on some discussion with your excellency on the subject of union with us; and by "us" I mean those who are supporters of the blessed man of God, Meletius. I hear, moreover, that the Paulinians are carrying about a letter of the Westerns assigning to them the episcopate of the Church in Antioch, but speaking under a false impression of Meletius, the admirable bishop of the true Church of God. I am not astonished at this ... But I shall never be able to persuade myself on these grounds to ignore Meletius, or to forget the Church which is under him, or to treat as small, and of little importance to the true religion, the questions which originated the division. I shall never consent to give in, merely because somebody is very much elated at receiving a letter from men.

From his letters it appears that Basil did not hold the popes in high esteem. When Basil wrote to the west for help (in combating Arianism) he addressed his letters to the whole western church. He did not especially write to Rome for help and did not even list it first.

To his brethren truly God-beloved and very dear, and fellow ministers of like mind, the bishops of Gaul and Italy, Basil, bishop of Cæsarea in Cappadocia.

Damasus was the leader of a group supporting the heretic Marcellus

If the anger of the Lord lasts on, what help can come to us from the frown of the West? Men who do not know the truth, and do not wish to learn it, but are prejudiced by false suspicions, are doing now as they did in the case of Marcellus when they quarrelled with men who told them the truth, and by their own action strengthened the cause of heresy.

Of the pope, St Basil wrote,

... but what possible good could accrue to the cause by communication between a man proud and exalted, and therefore quite unable to hear those who preach the truth to him from a lower standpoint, and a man like my brother, to whom anything like mean servility is unknown?

=== Coryphæus ===
Coryphæus means the head of the choir. Catholic apologists note that John Chrysostom uses the term to describe Peter. However he also uses this term in relation to others:

He took the coryphaei (plural) and led them up into a high mountain apart ... Why does He take these three alone? Because they excelled the others. Peter showed his excellence by his great love of Him, John by being greatly loved, James by the answer ... "We are able to drink the chalice."

The coryphaei, Peter the foundation of the Church, Paul the vessel of election.

It is argued by Catholics that John Chrysostom only uses the singular Coryphæus in relation to Peter. This is true, but others do not restrict the use of the singular to Peter.

Basil also uses the term Coryphæus. He refers to Athanasius as "Coryphæus of all."

He refers to Pope Damasus as Coryphæus, but as the leader of the westerners, not of the whole church.

Apart from the common document, I should like to have written to their Coryphæus.

Hesychius of Jerusalem uses the term Coryphæus to refer to James.

=== Maximus the Confessor ===
Pope Leo XIII has already been shown to have misquoted Athanasius. Whelton states that (in his encyclical Satis cognitum) he misquotes Maximus the Confessor. In Defloratio ex Epistola ad Petrum illustrem Maximus (also rendered Maximos) is alleged to have said:

Therefore if a man does not want to be, or to be called, a heretic, let him not strive to please this or that man ... but let him hasten before all things to be in communion with the Roman See.

Edward Denny giving his own translation and using that of Vincenzi shows that the words of Maximus give Rome a power conferred upon it by Holy Synods. This is in contrast with Catholic teaching and also would suggest that if a synod can confer power, it can also take it away. Denny states that Vincenzi is "compelled by the facts to admit that these very authorities to which St Maximus refers, as they have been handed down to us, are witness against the Papal Monarchy."

=== Formula of Pope Hormisdas ===
Under the emperor Anastasius I, the churches of Constantinople and Rome were in schism. However with the ascendency of the orthodox emperor Justin I, the two churches could be reconciled again. Justin ordered negotiations begin.

Pope Hormisdas issued a formula of orthodox catholic faith which the Patriarch John II could sign if he wished reunion of the two churches. It can namely be read in the formula:

Following, as we have said before, the Apostolic See in all things and proclaiming all its decisions, we endorse and approve all the letters which Pope St Leo wrote concerning the Christian religion. And so I hope I may deserve to be associated with you in the one communion which the Apostolic See proclaims, in which the whole, true, and perfect security of the Christian religion resides. I promise that from now on those who are separated from the communion of the Catholic Church, that is, who are not in agreement with the Apostolic See, will not have their names read during the sacred mysteries. But if I attempt even the least deviation from my profession, I admit that, according to my own declaration, I am an accomplice to those whom I have condemned. I have signed this, my profession, with my own hand, and I have directed it to you, Hormisdas, the holy and venerable pope of Rome."

Catholic apologists emphasize part of the text bolded above.

Those in agreement with orthodox faith would naturally be in agreement with the church in Rome on this matter – which was stating orthodox faith. For Catholic apologists agreement to this text means an agreement to Rome, because Rome is the leader. For Orthodox agreement to Rome is because it stated the truth.

For the Greeks, the text of the libellus meant a factual recognition that the apostolic Roman church had been consistent in orthodoxy for the past seventy years and, therefore deserved to become a rallying point for the Chalcedonians (those who accepted the Council of Chalcedon) of the East.

Further evidence seems to point to this. Patriarch John expressed his opinion that Rome (Old Rome) and Constantinople (New Rome) were on the same level. The Patriarch showed this when he added to the document:

I declare that the see of apostle Peter and the see of this imperial city are one.

Furthermore despite it being one of the demands in the formula the east continued to disregard papal demands by not condemning Acacius.

The politics of this is demonstrated by the fact that the Emperor Justin ignored the pope's candidate for the vacated see of Alexandria and instead "authorised the consecration of Timothy III, an intransigent Monophysite".

Theoderic, king in Italy, and an Arian grew suspicious of the new alliance between Rome and Constantinople. John who succeeded as pope was sent to Constantinople to restore Arian churches there. Thus the orthodox Catholic pope was sent to urge the restoration of churches to heretics. This the pope did with limited success.

== Opposition arguments from early church history ==
- The Church at Rome was founded (or more formally organised) by both Peter and Paul. As no particular charism or primacy attaches to Paul, then it is not from his co-foundation of the church of Rome that the Roman Pontiff claims primacy.
- As many Sees are of Peter, Peter serves as an archetype of "Apostle".
- While the See of Rome had primacy, it was a position of honour rather than power or magisterial authority.
- Rome is an Apostolic throne, not the Apostolic throne.
- Each bishop has the right to manage affairs within his local diocese. In the event of a dispute with another bishop, only a general council may rule on the matter.
- Church Fathers do not refer to another tier or clerical office above the ordinary episcopate.
- Cases which had been decided by Rome were appealed to bishops in other metropolitan areas.
- Cases which had been decided by Rome were appealed to synods of bishops in other metropolitan areas.
- Peter founded many episcopal sees; all such sees have equal standing.
- The Apostles were equal; no authority was withheld from any of them.
- The post-Constantinian church conferred upon the sees of Old Rome and later New Rome (Constantinople) the same degree of honor.
- Eastern Patriarchs have regarded the Bishop of Rome, occupying the only apostolic see in Western Christendom, as the Patriarch of the West (not of the entire church).
- Faced with exile, John Chrysostom, the Archbishop of Constantinople, wrote an appeal for help to three Western churchmen. While one of these was the bishop of Rome, had Rome exercised primacy at that time, he would not have written to the other two bishops.

=== "Keys of the Kingdom" ===
Orthodox Christians accept that Peter had a certain primacy. In the New Testament, he is first to be given the keys Matthew 16:18. However other texts may be interpreted to imply that the other Apostles also received the keys in Matthew 18:18. Such an interpretation, it is claimed, has been accepted by many Church Fathers; Tertullian, Hilary of Poitiers, John Chrysostom, Augustine.

=== Council of Jerusalem ===
The New Testament records (Acts 15) the convening of a council to decide whether gentiles who converted should be required to be circumcised, which according to some interpretations was prescribed by the Mosaic law. Catholic historians note that when Peter spoke, all were silent. However Whelton notes that when Paul and James spoke, all were silent as well.

Eusebius said that it was James who stated the decision of the Council, not Peter. John Chrysostom noted James made the decision.

The ruling of the Council was expressed as being the decision of all the council, not just Peter. Continuing with this the opening statements of official formulations normally begins with the phrase "Following the Holy Fathers", not "Following the ruling of the Pope."

=== Easter controversy ===
There existed a difference in how some local churches celebrated Easter: in the Roman province of Asia it was celebrated on the 14th of the moon (Quartodecimanism), not necessarily on Sunday. "Bishop Victor of Rome ordered synods to be held to settle the matter – an interesting early instance of synodality and indeed of popes encouraging synods – and excommunicated Polycrates of Ephesus and the bishops of Asia when their synod refused to adopt the Roman line. Victor was rebuked by Irenaeus for this severity and it seems that he revoked his sentence and that communion was preserved."

Eusebius wrote:

Victor, who presided over the church at Rome, immediately attempted to cut off from the common unity the parishes of all Asia, with the churches that agreed with them, as heterodox; and he wrote letters and declared all the brethren there wholly excommunicate. But this did not please all the bishops. And they besought him to consider the things of peace, and of neighborly unity and love. Words of theirs are extant, sharply rebuking Victor. Among them was Irenæus, who, sending letters in the name of the brethren in Gaul over whom he presided, maintained that the mystery of the resurrection of the Lord should be observed only on the Lord's day. He fittingly admonishes Victor that he should not cut off whole churches of God which observed the tradition of an ancient custom.

The matter will be eventually resolved at the First Ecumenical Council in line with Sunday observance.

== Eastern Orthodox arguments from Church Councils ==
=== First Ecumenical Council ===
Arius and his teachings were condemned by a synod of bishops which the pope summoned in 320. Alexander of Alexandria summoned a local synod in Alexandria in 321 which also condemned Arianism. Five years after the pope had condemned Arianism, Emperor Constantine I called an ecumenical council to settle the matter. Whelton argues that the pope's decision was not considered an end to the matter because a council in Africa met to examine the issue for itself. Constantine then ordered a larger council to decide on the matter.

The Fourth Canon of this council confirmed that bishops were to be appointed only locally.

=== Second Ecumenical Council ===
The Second Ecumenical Council was presided over by Meletius of Antioch, who was not in communion with Rome.

=== Third Ecumenical Council ===
The Third Ecumenical Council called Nestorius to account for his teachings following his condemnation as a heretic by Pope Celestine I. The council did not consider the papal condemnation as definitive.

Bishop Maret said,

The Pope had pronounced in the affair of Nestorius a canonical judgment clothed with all the authority of his see. He had prescribed its execution. Yet, three months after this sentence and before its execution, all the episcopate is invited to examine afresh and to decide freely the question in dispute.

St Vincent of Lerins:

And that blessed council holding their doctrine, following their counsel, believing their witness, submitting to their judgment without haste, without foregone conclusion, without partiality, gave their determination concerning the Rules of Faith.

In its condemnation of Nestorius, the language given is of the council ruling, not because the pope said so. Cyril writes that he, and his fellow bishop – the pope – had both condemned Nestorius.

Catholic apologists Fathers Rumble and Carty stated:

The Council of Ephesus in 431, embracing all Bishops and not even held at Rome, decreed, "No one can doubt, indeed it is known to all ages, that Peter, Prince and Head of the Apostles and Foundation of the Catholic Church, received the keys of the kingdom from Christ our Redeemer, and that to this day and always he lives in his successors exercising judgment."

It is true that the statement was made at the council. It is however not a "decree". It was a statement by a priest during the deliberations of the council. This priest, Philip, was at the council to represent the pope. It was not a decree or finding made by the council and remains his opinion.

=== Fourth Ecumenical Council ===
The Fourth Ecumenical Council was called against the expressed wishes of the pope.

=== Fifth Ecumenical Council ===
A controversy arose out of the writings known as Three Chapters – written by bishops Theodore, Theodoret, and Ibas. Pope Vigilius opposed the condemnation of the Three Chapters. At the Fifth Ecumenical Council (553) the assembled bishops condemned and anathematized Three Chapters. After the council threatened to excommunicate him and remove him from office, Vigilius changed his mind – blaming the devil for misleading him. Bossuet wrote:

These things prove, that in a matter of the utmost importance, disturbing the whole Church, and seeming to belong to the Faith, the decress of sacred council prevail over the decrees of Pontiffs, and the letter of Ibas, though defended by a judgment of the Roman Pontiff could nevertheless be proscribed as heretical.

German theologian Karl Josef von Hefele notes that the council was called "without the assent of the Pope".

=== Sixth Ecumenical Council ===
At the Sixth Ecumenical Council, both Pope Honorius and Patriarch Sergius I of Constantinople were declared heretics.

The holy council said: After we had reconsidered, according to our promise which we had made to your highness, the doctrinal letters of Sergius, at one time patriarch of this royal god-protected city to Cyrus, who was then bishop of Phasis and to Honorius some time Pope of Old Rome, as well as the letter of the latter to the same Sergius, we find that these documents are quite foreign to the apostolic dogmas, to the declarations of the holy Councils, and to all the accepted Fathers, and that they follow the false teachings of the heretics; therefore we entirely reject them, and execrate them as hurtful to the soul

The council anathematized them, declared them tools of the devil, and cast them out of the church.

The popes (from Pope Leo II) themselves adhered to the Council's ruling and added Honorius to their list of heretics, before quietly dropping his name in the eleventh century. The Catholic Encyclopedia states:

... also in the oath taken by every new pope from the eighth century to the eleventh in the following words: "Together with Honorius, who added fuel to their wicked assertions" (Liber diurnus, ii, 9).

So too the Seventh Ecumenical Council declared its adhesion to the anathema in its decree of faith. Thus an Ecumenical Council could rule on the faith of a pope and expel him from the church.

=== Council in Trullo ===
The Council in Trullo is considered by some E. Orthodox as a continuation of the sixth.

At this council it was confirmed (in canon 39) that the local church could regulate itself, have its own special laws and regulations.

=== Council of Sardica ===
It is claimed by Catholic apologists that this council offers proof of papal primacy. In particular this reference is used:

The reason for your absence was both honorable and imperative, that the schismatic wolves might not rob and plunder by stealth nor the heretical dogs bark madly in the rapid fury nor the very serpent, the devil, discharge his blasphemous venom. So it seems to us right and altogether fitting that priests of the Lord from each and every province should report to their head, that is, to the See of Peter, the Apostle.

— Council of Sardica, to Pope Julius (AD 342).

It is further stated that Athanasius referred to this council as "the Great Council".

However, this council was not an ecumenical one and not all of it was initially accepted by the east, who in fact refused to attend because of their Arian-leanings and their opposition to Athanasius. Apart from the fact that the council at Sardica was not accepted by the whole church until at least the Council at Trullo hundreds of years later, Sardica had only given to the bishop of Rome jurisdiction as a court of final appeal. Pope Zosimus would later misrepresent the Council of Sardica in order to bolster his claims for power over the churches in Africa.

... the canons were repudiated by the African Church in 418 and 424. But, most important of all, the Byzantine Church never submitted itself to papal scrutiny in the manner prescribed by Sardica.

Additionally some believe the clause "their head, that is, to the See of Peter, the Apostle" to be an interpolation, because of the bad grammar of the Latin.

=== Western councils ===
==== Filioque ====
In 809, when Pope Leo III was asked to approve the addition to the Nicene Creed of the Filioque, first included by the Third Council of Toledo (589) and later adopted widely in Spain, the Frankish empire and England, he refused:

In 809 a council was held at Aix-la-Chapelle by Charlemagne, and from it three divines were sent to confer with the Pope, Leo III, upon the subject. The Pope opposed the insertion of the Filioque on the express ground that the General Councils had forbidden any addition to be made to their formulary ... So firmly resolved was the Pope that the clause should not be introduced into the creed that he presented two silver shields to the Confessio in St. Peter’s at Rome, on one of which was engraved the creed in Latin and on the other in Greek, without the addition.

The claim that Pope John VIII also condemned the addition of the Filioque is disputed. Philip Schaff says there are different opinions about when the addition was accepted in Rome, whether by Pope Nicholas I (858-867), Pope Sergius III (904-911) or, as is most commonly believed, by Pope Benedict VIII (1014–1015). When arguing "that so far from the insertion being made by the Pope, it was made in direct opposition to his wishes and command", he says:

It was not till 1014 that for the first time the interpolated creed was used at mass with the sanction of the Pope. In that year Benedict VIII. acceded to the urgent request of Henry II. of Germany and so the papal authority was forced to yield, and the silver shields have disappeared from St. Peter's.

==== Council of Frankfurt ====
The Council of Frankfurt was held in 794. "Two papal legates were present, Theophylact and Stephen." Despite the presence of papal representatives it still repudiated the terms of the Seventh Ecumenical Council – despite the fact that the Seventh was accepted by the pope.

== Rome's supposed primacy ==
=== First pope ===
The Catholic church states that Rome's supremacy rests on the pope being given power handed down from the first pope – Peter.

However there is evidence that Peter was not the first bishop, and that the church in Rome was founded (or organized) by Peter and Paul together.

"The blessed apostles having founded and established the church, entrusted the office of the episcopate to Linus. Paul speaks of this Linus in his Epistles to Timothy.

That is Linus is entrusted by the Apostles (plural). It is suggested that this evidence means that Linus was pope whilst Peter was still alive. Rome's church could be said to be founded (or organised) on both Peter and Paul.

=== Primacy based on Peter and Paul ===
Rome had primacy, but it was one of honor, rather than power. The reasons for this are varied. One being that it was a see founded by both Peter and Paul. This honor was given not because of the 'primacy' of Peter (which is Catholic teaching), but on the position of both Peter and Paul. This was the accepted position, even in the West.

Augustine and Theodoret also wrote on the greatness of Rome – but for being the largest city, and its foundation on Peter and Paul. Rome's degree of 'primacy' was affirmed by one hundred and fifty bishops meeting at the Council of Chalcedon. For this council Rome's primacy rested on the fact it was once the imperial capital.

=== Canon XXVIII of the Council of Chalcedon ===
This canon above comes up in numerous discussions on Papal Supremacy. For Orthodox it demonstrates a fluidity to the placing of honors – it shows Constantinople's place of honor moving up higher than older Sees such as Jerusalem, Alexandria and, Antioch.

Pope Leo I protested against the inclusion of this canon and refused to sign agreement to it. The Catholic encyclopaedia says:

"In reply Pope Leo protested most energetically against canon xxviii and declared it null and void as being against the prerogatives of Bishops of Alexandria and Antioch, and against the decrees of the Council of Nicaea. Like protests were contained in the letters written 22 May 452, to Emperor Marcian, Empress Pulcheria, and Anatolius of Constantinople. Otherwise the pope ratified the Acts of the Council of Chalcedon, but only inasmuch as they referred to matters of faith."

The pope protested on behalf of two other Sees' privileges, not on a matter of his own power. However despite his energetic protests the canon remained adhered to by the eastern churches. It was confirmed in the east at the Council of Trullo in 692, where the four major eastern patriarchs attended; Paul of Constantinople, Peter of Alexandria, Anastasius of Jerusalem, George of Antioch. Thus despite the wishes of the pope the eastern churches ignored his protests.

Eventually it was accepted in the West. In 1215 at the Fourth Council of the Lateran the Roman church accepted Constantinople's position – albeit when Constantinople was in western hands following the Fourth Crusade. Subsequently at the Council of Florence this was confirmed to the Greek Patriarch of Constantinople.

"... and so the opposition of Rome gave way after seven centuries and a half, and the Nicene Canon which Leo declared to be "inspired by the Holy Ghost" and "valid to the end of time"

=== Rome as an archetype church ===
The church in Rome is occasionally singled out.

Cyprian

"And this unity we ought firmly to hold and assert, especially those of us that are bishops who preside in the Church, that we may. Let no one deceive the brotherhood by a falsehood: let no one corrupt the truth of the faith by perfidious prevarication. The episcopate is one, each part of which is held by each one for the whole."

=== Equality of the Apostles ===
Peter and Paul taught the same as each other. All the Apostles were the foundation (rock) of the church. Nothing was withheld from any of the Apostles. When they preached they did so with equal knowledge. Peter preached to the Jews as Paul preached to the Gentiles.

Tertullian

"Was anything withheld from the knowledge of Peter, who is called "the rock on which the church should be built," who also obtained "the keys of the kingdom of heaven," with the power of "loosing and binding in heaven and on earth?" Was anything, again, concealed from John, the Lord's most beloved disciple, who used to lean on His breast to whom alone the Lord pointed Judas out as the traitor, whom He commended to Mary as a son in His own stead?"

John Chrysostomon

"As a king sending forth governors, gives power to cast into prison and to deliver from it, so in sending these forth, Christ investeth them with the same power.

Cyril of Alexandria

"One therefore is Christ both Son and Lord, not as if a man had attained only such a conjunction with God as consists in a unity of dignity alone or of authority. For it is not equality of honour which unites natures; for then Peter and John, who were of equal honour with each other, being both Apostles and holy disciples."

=== "Rock" ===
Orthodox Christians believe all people can share in God. In a process called Theosis. We are all called to be rock. That is to share in the same nature. Thus from the earliest times the foundation of the church can be said to be; the faith; Jesus; the Apostles, not just Peter.

The Shepherd of Hermas:

"First of all, sir," I said, "explain this to me: What is the meaning of the rock and the gate?" "This rock", he answered, "and this gate are the Son of God."

The Liturgy of St. James:

For the strengthening of your holy, Catholic and Apostolic Church, which you founded on the rock of the faith, so that the gates of Hell might not prevail against it, delivering it from every heresy and from the scandals caused by those who work iniquity, and from the enemies who arise and attack it, until the consummation of the age.

Peter is referred to as rock but other Christian writers use the term in describing others; Hippolytus of Rome; Victorinus of Pettau; Gregory of Nyssa; Hilary of Poitiers; Jerome;Basil the Great; Gregory Thaumaturgus; Ambrosiaster; Aphraates; Athanasius; Origen; John Cassian

The Orthodox Christian position is that all members of the church are called to be 'rock'; just as the church is built on the foundation of all the Apostles (Ephesians 2:20), all are called to be stones (1Peter 2:4–9). Protestant Matthew Henry's bible commentary notes this too when he states,

"The church is built upon the foundation of the apostles. The first stones of that building were laid in and by their ministry; hence their names are said to be written in the foundations of the new Jerusalem."

Peter described himself as a fellow elder 1Peter 5:1, placing himself on equal footing with the other disciples.

For these early writers, Peter's leading position does not carry a special status that places him in a class different from all the other disciples of Jesus, nor do they imply that Peter's personal privileges and authority are transmitted to his successors in any particular church."

=== Peter as "Prince of the Apostles" ===
Peter is often called the Prince of the Apostles. If such a special title meant that he held a special charism it was not exclusively Rome's. Other Sees had been founded by Peter. Pope Gregory the Great recognised these Sees were all equally as Sees of Peter. There is no difference between the Sees of Peter.

Pope Gregory

"Your most sweet Holiness has spoken much in your letter to me about the chair of Saint Peter, Prince of the apostles, saying that he himself now sits on it in the persons of his successors ...

Wherefore though there are many apostles, yet with regard to the principality itself the See of the Prince of the apostles alone has grown strong in authority, which in three places is the See of one ...

He himself established (sic) the See in which, though he was to leave it, he sat for seven years. Since then it is the See of one, and one See, over which by Divine authority three bishops now preside, whatever good I hear of you, this I impute to myself. "

Theodoret also refers to other Sees being thrones of Peter.

==== Peter as the Archetype ====
As all are called to be rock, and as many Sees are of Peter, Peter serves as an archetype of Apostle. When he receives the keys he represents all of the Apostles. This is found in the writings of Augustine and Cyprian.

==== Gregory the Great ====
The pope now holds the title of universal bishop. However such titles once raised the ire of popes.

Pope Gregory the Great heard that Patriarch John the Faster had accepted the title ecumenical patriarch. This simply meant patriarch to the emperor, not 'universal' patriarch.

The pope wrote to the emperor to protest that any one bishop should be accorded the title universal bishop.

Gregory first accords Peter the title prince of the Apostles.

"For to all who know the Gospel it is apparent that by the Lord’s voice the care of the whole Church was committed to the holy Apostle and Prince of all the Apostles, Peter.

Gregory notes that honor was bestowed upon Peter and the church in Rome – given it by an ecumenical council, but that no one person used the title. It was an honor for all priests. Gregory emphatically says no one person should have such a title.

==== Pelagianism ====
During the controversies surrounding Pelagius' heresies a council in Mileve (in Numidia) found against Pelagianism. They then wrote to the pope seeking his help. They gave him much praise:

"We write this from the council of Numidia, imitating our colleagues of the church and province of Carthage, who we understand have written on this matter to the apostolic see, which your blessedness adorns."

Catholic apologists may make the most of such praise. However in the context of history one must also note that this praise was conditional. The next pope Zosimus did not out-rightly condemn the heresy Pelagianism and was himself condemned by the rest of the church for back-pedalling.

Thus the same church (in Africa) could lavish praise upon the church in Rome but could equally condemn them, depending on the teachings Rome upheld.

Zosimus eventually reconfirmed the decision of Innocent, Pelagius went to the churches in Palestine where a synod was called to hear his case. Augustine says that the churches in Palestine were deceived by Pelagius. What is important though is that even after two popes had condemned him Pelagius could still seek judgment by another region's synod. Evidently the Palestinian churches did not see the condemnation of the church in Rome and the church in Africa as binding.

It would take an ecumenical council to bring the churches to agreement on this matter.

==== Cyprian ====
In the encyclical Satis cognitum Pope Leo XIII misquotes Cyprian.

"To be in communion with (pope) Cornelius is to be in communion with the Catholic Church"

The quotation is taken from Cyprian's letter to Antonianus who was questioning whether he should be loyal to Cornelius or another claimant to the pontificate Novation. Cornelius selection as bishop of Rome was backed by sixteen bishops. Cyprian stated that Novation:

"... strives by bribery to be made an adulterous and extraneous bishop by the hands of deserters; and although there is one Church, divided by Christ throughout the whole world into many members, and also one episcopate diffused through a harmonious multitude of many bishops

Therefore to adhere to a heretic (Novation) is to separate oneself from the Catholic Church. Furthermore Cyprian confirms here that the one church is divided into many bishoprics throughout the world. He goes on to say in the same letter:

" While the bond of concord remains, and the undivided sacrament of the Catholic Church endures, every bishop disposes and directs his own acts, and will have to give an account of his purposes to the Lord

Cyprian is used several times in Catholic apologetics.

"And although He assigns a like power to all the Apostles yet He founded a single Chair, thus establishing by His own authority the source and hallmark of the [Church's] oneness. No doubt the others were all that Peter was, but a primacy is given to Peter, and it is [thus] made clear that there is but one Church and one Chair. So too, even if they are all shepherds, we are shown but one flock which is to be fed by all the Apostles in common accord. If a man does not hold fast to this oneness of Peter, does he imagine that he still holds the faith? If he deserts the Chair of Peter upon whom the Church was built, has he still confidence that he is in the Church?"

The Jesuit scholar Bévnot notes,

"A primacy is give to Peter primatus Petro datur ... To translate primatus by 'the primacy' is to contradict the context which speaks of the Apostles as being equal in power, equally shepherds."

==== Cyprian and Augustine ====
The local church decides for itself

The seventh council of Carthage under Cyprian stated the position that each local church to decide upon matters.

Cyprian was adamant that the popes had no power over him. Cyprian in his dispute believed he was following the teachings of the Apostles. He appealed to what he believed was always taught and this was the faith as maintained by all the Apostles. He addressed Pope Stephen not as his master, but as his equal.

"For we find also, in the Acts of the Apostles, that this is maintained by the apostles, and kept in the truth of the saving faith, so that when, in the house of Cornelius the centurion, the Holy Ghost had descended upon the Gentiles who were there, fervent in the warmth of their faith, and believing in the Lord with their whole heart; and when, filled with the Spirit, they blessed God in divers tongues, still none the less the blessed Apostle Peter, mindful of the divine precept and the Gospel, commanded that those same men should be baptized who had already been filled with the Holy Spirit, that nothing might seem to be neglected to the observance by the apostolic instruction in all things of the law of the divine precept and Gospel"

Augustine supports Cyprian

Thus Cyprian's stance does not evidence Papal Supremacy. The pope had condemned this position but one local church continued on with its own matters in the manner it decided. Importantly Augustine, who disagrees with Cyprian's stance on dogma does not condemn Cyprian's manner.

Augustine agreed with Cyprian's right to decide within his local church ... As Michael Whelton observed "He does not condemn Cyprian for refusing to submit to the Bishop of Rome"

Despite the fact that the pope had condemned Cyprian’s position, a general council had not yet ruled on the matter. Augustine recognises this fact.

Augustine is of the belief that Cyprian might have changed his mind if a general (ecumenical) council had been called. He states that a council would have the ultimate say in removing all doubt. Augustine had elsewhere argued that a council could over-rule a local church – even the church in Rome.

Adherence to the Bishop of Rome was not "necessary" for unity.

==== St Vincent of Lérins ====
As Augustine argues that Cyprian would have rejoined orthodox belief following a general council, Vincent of Lérins wrote on what he considered constituted the teachings of the Catholic Church. His opening "General Rule" mentions no adhesion to the Bishop of Rome, rather what is taught by all the church. Hasler sums this up as:

"... a teaching can only be defined if it has been held to be revealed at all times, everywhere, and by all believers."

This same rule would be used also to argue against Papal infallibility.

==== Second Council of Lyon ====
For Eastern Orthodox, the acceptance of a council relies on two points, it must not only state the faith as always taught, but also be accepted by the whole church. A council can rule and still be rejected by the faithful. Some Catholic historians maintain that the Second Council of Lyon of 1272 shows the churches of the east submitting to Roman authority. It was at this council that the Roman (Byzantine) Emperor Michael endeavored to re-unite the churches (split apart at the Great Schism in 1054).

The delegation who attended from the east however did not represent the churches in the east, but the Emperor himself. They were his personal emissaries.

Historian Steven Runciman notes;

"But on the whole it was only amongst the laymen of the Court that any supporters of a union could be found; and they were moved by political rather than religious considerations."

Michael had genuinely wished re-union. His primary fear was not an attack from the Turks, but the fear of a renewed effort by the Latin west against the Empire – one must remember that this is not long after Michael had recaptured Constantinople from the Latin west – which had held it since the Fourth Crusade in 1204. With the failure of this attempt at union through a political solution, Michaels fears were realised when the pope concluded an alliance with Charles of Anjou in 1281. The empire and the dynasty were saved from military intervention only by the Sicilian Vespers, (a rebellion that broke out in Palermo).

== See also ==
- Protestant opposition to papal supremacy
