= Gaudentius of Novara =

Bishop of Novara

Saint Gaudentius of Novara
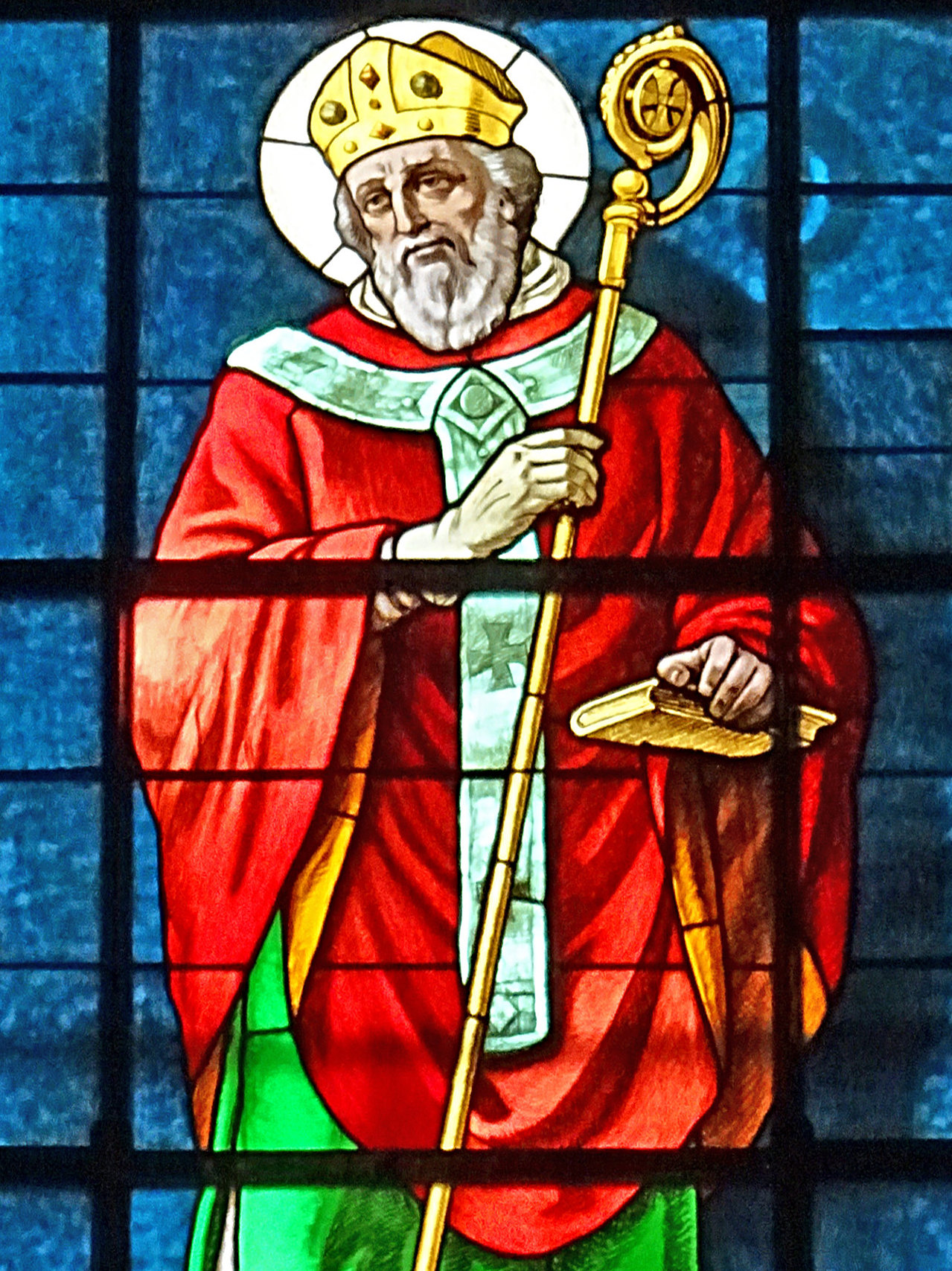
- Gaudentius, on a glass of Basilica di San Vittore (Intra)
- Born: Ivrea
- Died: early 5th century
- Venerated in: Roman Catholic Church, Orthodox Church
- Feast: 22 January

Saint Gaudentius (fl. end of 4th century-early 5th century) was a bishop of Novara, considered the first of that city. Tradition states that he was born to a pagan family at Ivrea, and was then converted to Christianity by Eusebius of Vercelli. Some sources say that Eusebius ordained Gaudentius a priest, and that Gaudentius was sent to Novara by Eusebius to assist a Christian priest named Laurence (Laurentius) there.

== Biography ==
Eusebius of Vercelli was exiled after a synod held at Milan (355); some sources state that Gaudentius accompanied him in exile. Eusebius ordered him back to Novara, where Laurence had been killed. Gaudentius was supported in his mission by a new ally: Saint Ambrose, bishop of Milan. Simplician, Ambrose's successor, consecrated Gaudentius as bishop of Novara in 398 AD.

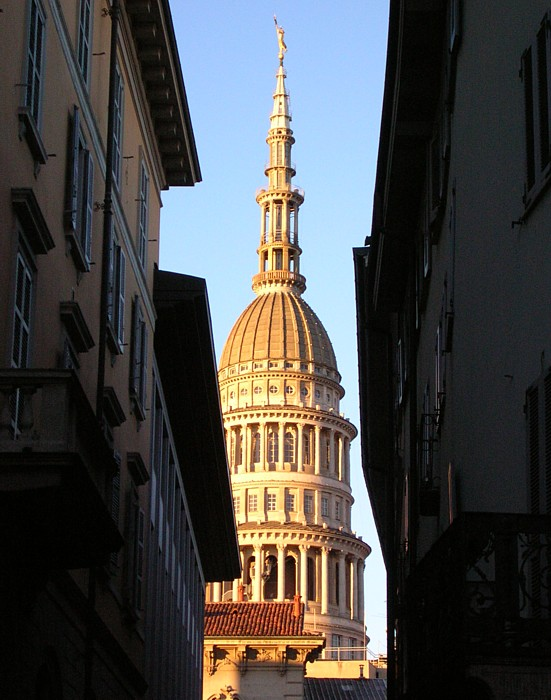
Basilica of San Gaudenzio

Gaudentius preached and ordained many new clergymen. A miracle reported of his death states that Gaudentius’ head continued to speak after the saint had died, so that the clergy could record and repeat his sermons.

The Basilica of San Gaudenzio in Novara, as well as numerous churches throughout the region, is dedicated to him. Gaudentius is depicted holding a model of a church.
