= Basilica of San Simpliciano =

Ancient church in Milan, Lombardy, Italy

Basilica of Saint Simplician Basilica di San Simpliciano
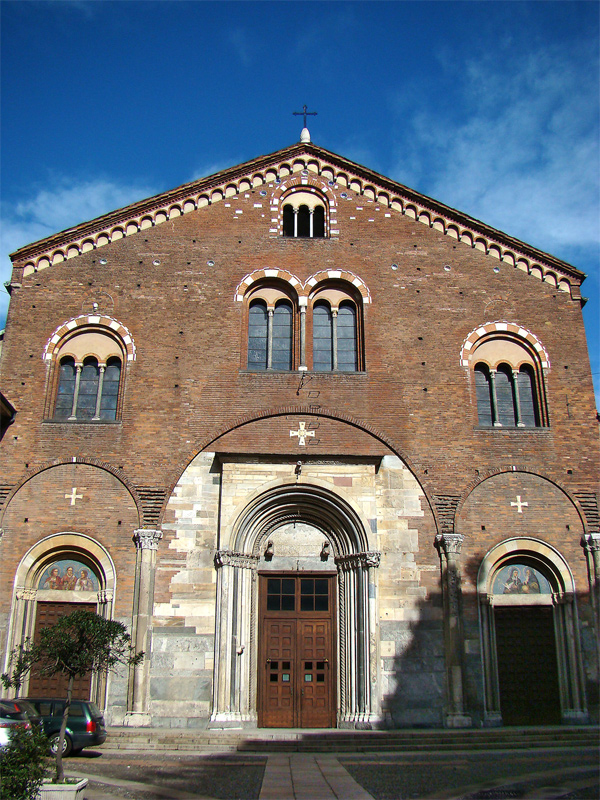
- Façade of San Simpliciano.

Religion
- Affiliation: Roman Catholic
- Rite: Ambrosian Rite
- Year consecrated: 3rd-century
- Status: Active

Location
- Location: Milan, Italy
- Interactive map of Basilica of Saint Simplician; Basilica di San Simpliciano
- Coordinates: 45°28′26″N 9°11′04″E

Architecture
- Type: Church
- Style: Latin cross plan, with a four-bay nave and two aisles.

Website
- www.sansimpliciano.it

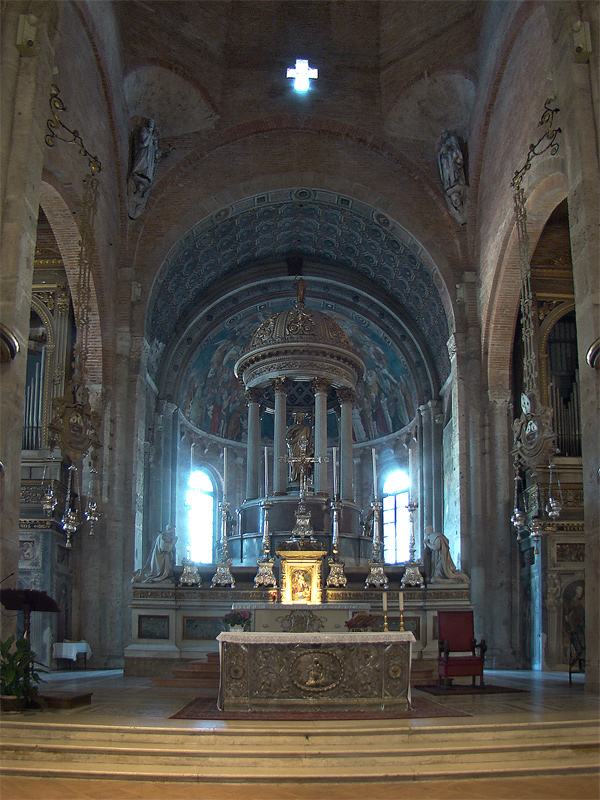
Main altar.

The Basilica of San Simpliciano is an ancient Roman Catholic church in the centre of Milan, region of Lombardy, Italy: the church, commissioned by the 4th century bishop St Ambrose, is the second-oldest known Christian church with a Latin cross layout. It is dedicated to Saint Simplician, who was Ambrose's successor as bishop of Milan.

== History ==
In the 3rd century, the site of the present church was occupied by a pagan cemetery. Here St. Ambrose commissioned the construction of the Basilica Virginum ("Basilica of the Virgins"), which was finished by his successor Simplicianus, who was buried there. A brick with the mark of the Lombard King Agilulf shows that repairs were made between 590 and 615 AD.

In the ninth century the Cluniac Benedictines took possession of the church. In 1176, a legend associated with the church arose and spread, that held miraculously the bodies of the martyrs held in this church flew as doves to the field of Battle of Legnano, and landed on the city of Milan's Carroccio, (a ceremonial war wagon). This was interpreted by troops as the divine sign promising victory against Frederick Barbarossa's army.

When the building was modified between the 12th and 13th centuries, giving it the present Romanesque appearance, the original walls were preserved to a height of 22 meters. On the night of 6–7 April 1252 the body of Peter of Verona (later St. Peter Martyr) lay in state after his assassination. A great multitude came to watch vigil, and the origins of Peter's cult began, as people started to report miraculous occurrences. In 1517, the convent was placed under the control of the Benedictines of Montecassino.The Benedictines remained here until 1798, when the convent was secularized, and for a time, the monastery was turned into barracks.

In the 16th century the Spanish governor Ferrante Gonzaga had the bell tower lowered by 25 meters. The dome and the side wings were also modified in 1582. Other interventions were carried out in the 19th century, with poor results, while the façade was reworked in 1870. In 1927 stained-glass windows portraying episodes of the battle of Legnano were added.

== Architecture and art ==
On the façade, the arcades that surmount the portals indicate the presence of an ancient portico, now disappeared. The upper part, the most modified in the 19th century, has two mullioned windows in the centre, an upper triple mullioned window and decorative arches. Late Renaissance mullioned windows also decorate the bell tower.

The interior is on the Latin cross plan, with a four-bay nave and two aisles. The transept is divided into two aisles.

The side chapels have decorations from various eras, from Renaissance to Baroque, Rococo and Neoclassical. In the right transept is a painting by Alessandro Varotari (Il Padovanino) portraying the Defeat of the Cammolesi. Next to the apse entrance are saints frescoed by Aurelio Luini. The apse vault is decorated by what is considered Ambrogio da Fossano's masterwork, the Incoronation of Mary.

Also on the left of the apse is the entrance to the small sacellum dedicated to the Martyrs of Anaunia, not before the end of the fourth century, as in a passage in Maximus of Turin's Sermo 81 Maximus designates himself a witness of the martyrdom of three missionary priests in 397 at Anaunia in the Rhaetian Alps.

The western wall of the transept has a Marriage of the Virgin by Camillo Procaccini.

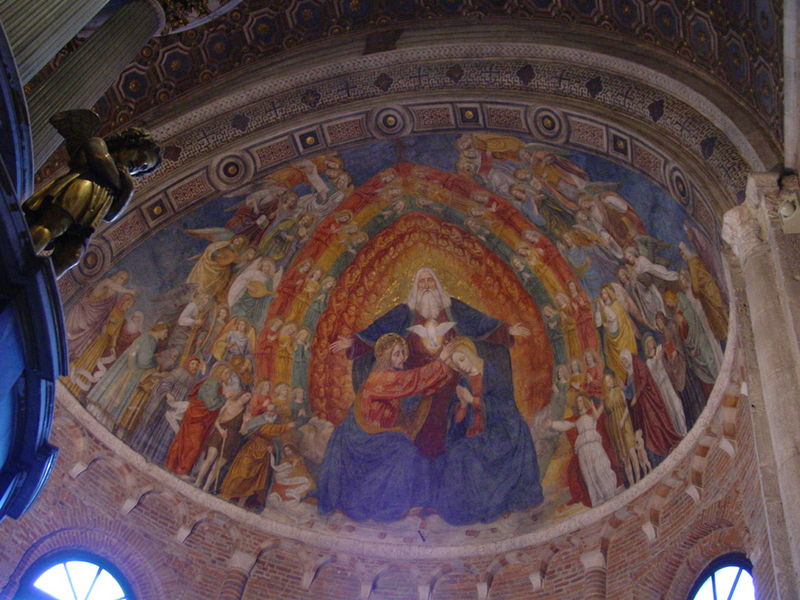
The Coronation of Mary by Bergognone

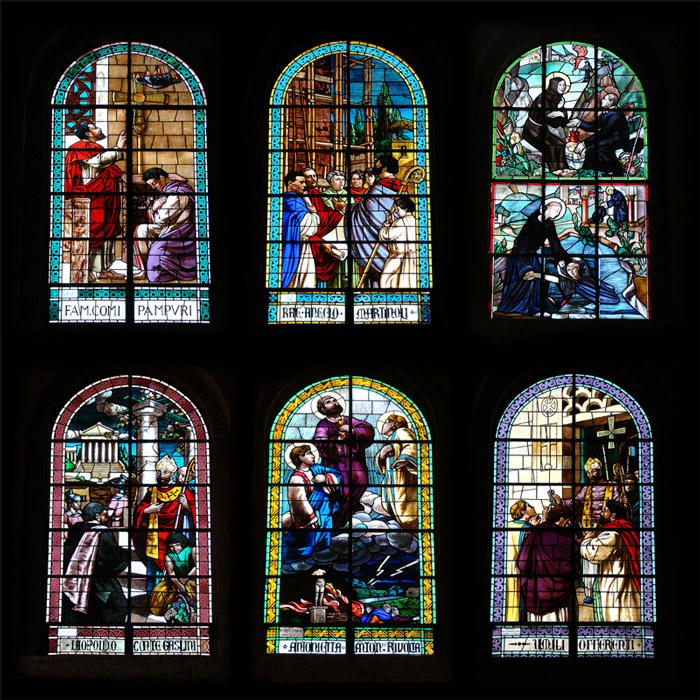
Stained-glass windows

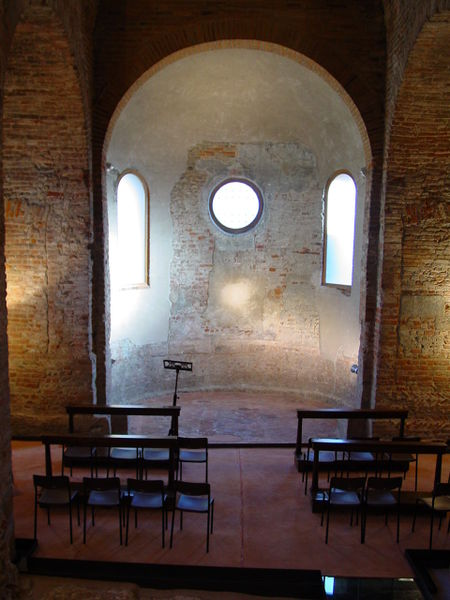
The Sacellum of the Martyrs of Anaunia

== See also ==
- Early Christian churches in Milan
