= Mordaunt (disambiguation) =

Mordaunt is a surname and a given name.

Mordaunt may also refer to:

- Viscount Mordaunt, see Earl of Peterborough for the two holders of the title
- Baron Mordaunt, a title in the Peerage of England
- Mordaunt baronets, a title in the Baronetage of England
- Penny Mordaunt, a British Conservative politician
- HMS Mordaunt, 17th century Royal Navy ship of the line

== See also ==
- Mordaunt-Short, a UK loudspeaker manufacturer founded by Norman Mordaunt and Rodney Short
- Mordant (disambiguation)
- Mordent
