= Simplician =

Saint & bishop (c. 320 - 400)

Saint Simplician
- Archbishop of Milan
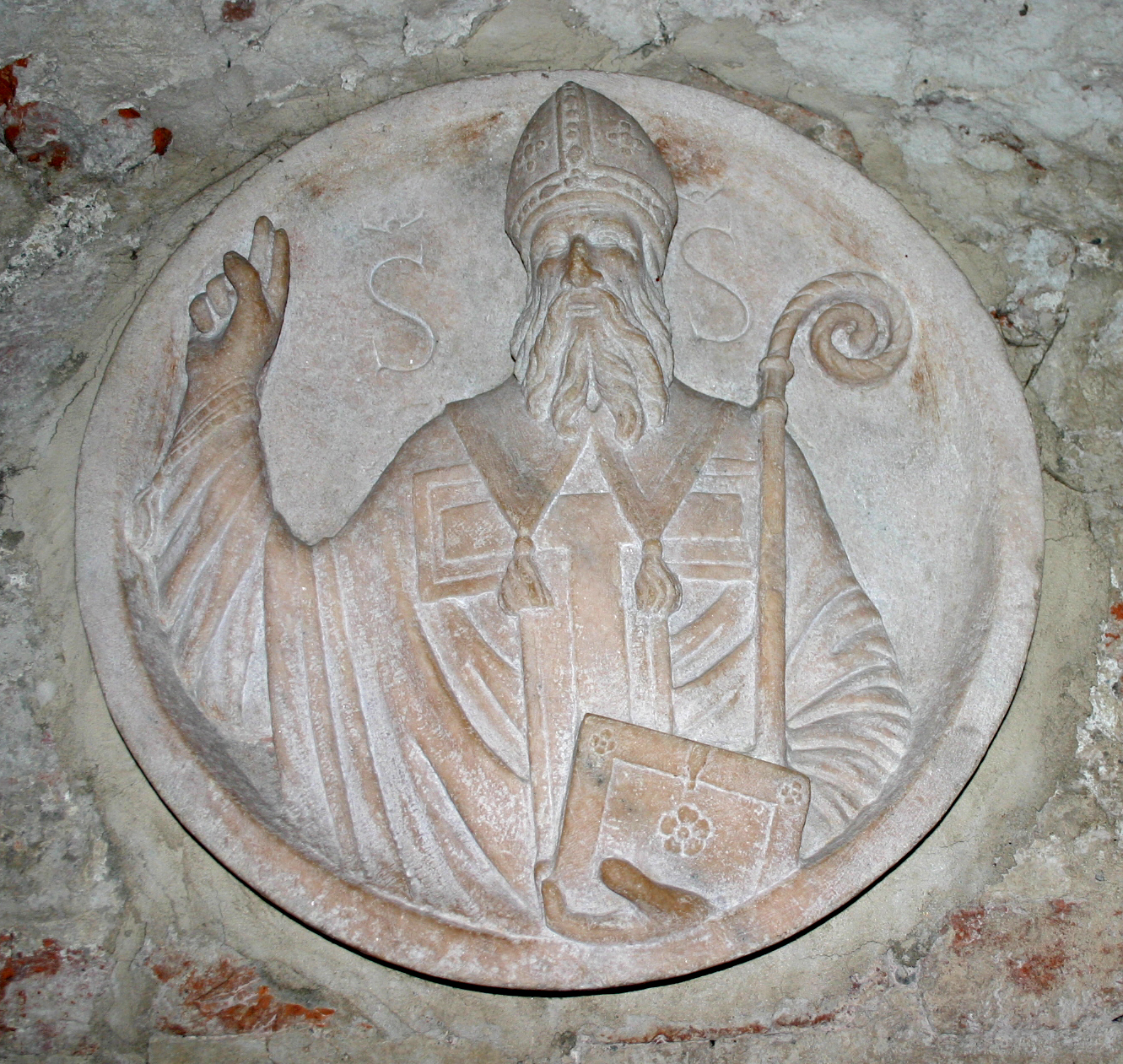
- Relief tondo of Saint Simplician
- Appointed: 397 AD
- Term ended: 400 or 401 AD
- Predecessor: Ambrose
- Successor: Venerius

Personal details
- Born: c. 320 AD Brivio, Roman Italy, Roman Empire
- Died: 400 or 401 AD Milan, Roman Italy, Roman Empire

Sainthood
- Feast day: August 14
- Venerated in: Eastern Orthodox Church; Roman Catholic Church
- Shrines: Basilica of St. Simplician

Simplician (Latin: Simplicianus; Italian: Simpliciano) was Bishop of Milan from 397 to 400 or 401 AD. He is honoured as a Saint in the Roman Catholic and Eastern Orthodox Churches and his feast day is August 14.

== Life ==
Simplician was born about 320 probably in Rome and still young he became a churchman. He became expert in the Holy Scripture and very educated. In about 355 he took an active part in the conversion to Christianity of the philosopher Marius Victorinus. When in 374 Ambrose was elected bishop of Milan and baptized, Simplician became his teacher of doctrine. Ambrose used to call Simplician father, as a sign of spiritual relationship. Probably in this period Simplician moved to Milan where he remained.

Simplician took also an active part in the conversions of both Alypius of Thagaste and Augustine of Hippo. The meeting between Augustine and Simplican occurred in Milan in 386 and it is recorded in Augustine's Confessions. After his conversion, Augustine also called Simplician father, and in 397 he dedicated to Simplician two books on the issue of predestination, known as De Diversis Quaestionibus ad Simplicianum.

On his deathbed, Ambrose supported Simplician as his own successor, stating that Simplician was "old but good". Thus in April 397, the aged Simplician was elected bishop of Milan, at that time capital of the Western Roman Empire. The most important act of his episcopate was the receipt in Milan of the relics of the three martyrs Sisinnius, Martyrius and Alexander, sent from Trento by the bishop Vigilius.

Simplician was asked to judge some doctrinal statements by the Council of Carthage (397) and by the First Council of Toledo. He also consecrated Gaudentius of Novara a bishop, and according to the 13th-century writer Goffredo of Bussero, he organized the texts of the Ambrosian liturgy.

Simplician's feast day was anciently set on 15 August, together with the feast of the translation to Milan of the relics of Sisinnius, Martyrius and Alexander; so his death was deemed to have been on 15 August 400; but probably Simplician died between the end of 400 and the first half of 401. Simplician's feast day was later moved to 16 August so as not to conflict with the Assumption of Mary, and with the reform of the Ambrosian Rite that occurred after the Second Vatican Council his feast day was moved to 14 August.

Simplician was initially buried in the church of Saint Nabor and Felix in Milan and later translated, perhaps on 15 August, to the Basilica Virginum ("Basilica of the Virgins") which was renamed in his honor; now it is known as Basilica of St. Simplician. In 1582 St Carlo Borromeo, the cardinal archbishop of Milan, ordered a canonical recognition of Simplicianus' remains who were tumulated under the major altar and then his holy relics were translated during a solemn procession to the odiern temple.
