= Protestant opposition to papal supremacy =

Opposition to papal supremacy

Protestants are opposed to the Roman Catholic doctrine of papal supremacy. Protestant Christians argue that the tradition of the See of Rome's primacy in the early Church was not equivalent to the current doctrine of supremacy.

== History ==
Martin Luther used to be a devout Roman Catholic who highly esteemed the Pope. Luther first believed that the problems with the church lay with the curia around the Pope but not the Pope himself. After nailing his 95 theses, he even had hope that the Pope would accept them. Later, however, Luther developed his critical approach against the papacy, especially after his excommunication in 1521.

In England as Henry VIII wanted annul his marriage, but the Pope would not grant it, thus King Henry rejected the Pope's authority and started the Church of England.

In 1537 Philip Melanchton made a book against papal primacy named "Treatise on the Power and Primacy of the Pope", Melanchton argued that the papacy had no basis on either history or scripture.

== Scripture ==
Matthew 16:18 has caused much controversy, the Catholic church sees this as the basis for the papacy. A common Protestant interpretation is that the Rock is Peter's confession or Peter's confession about Jesus' identity.

== Papacy as the Antichrist ==
Martin Luther claimed that the papacy is the Antichrist, which was influenced by the events of his life, but also by Lorenzo Valla. The view that the papacy was the Antichrist was held by radical followers of Jan Hus and by most Protestants in the 16th and 17th centuries. However this view has changed in the modern day among many Protestants.

The belief that the Papacy is the Antichrist is still held by Seventh Day Adventists.

== See also ==
- Eastern Orthodox opposition to papal supremacy
