= Madonna and Child with a Book =

Painting by Vincenzo Foppa

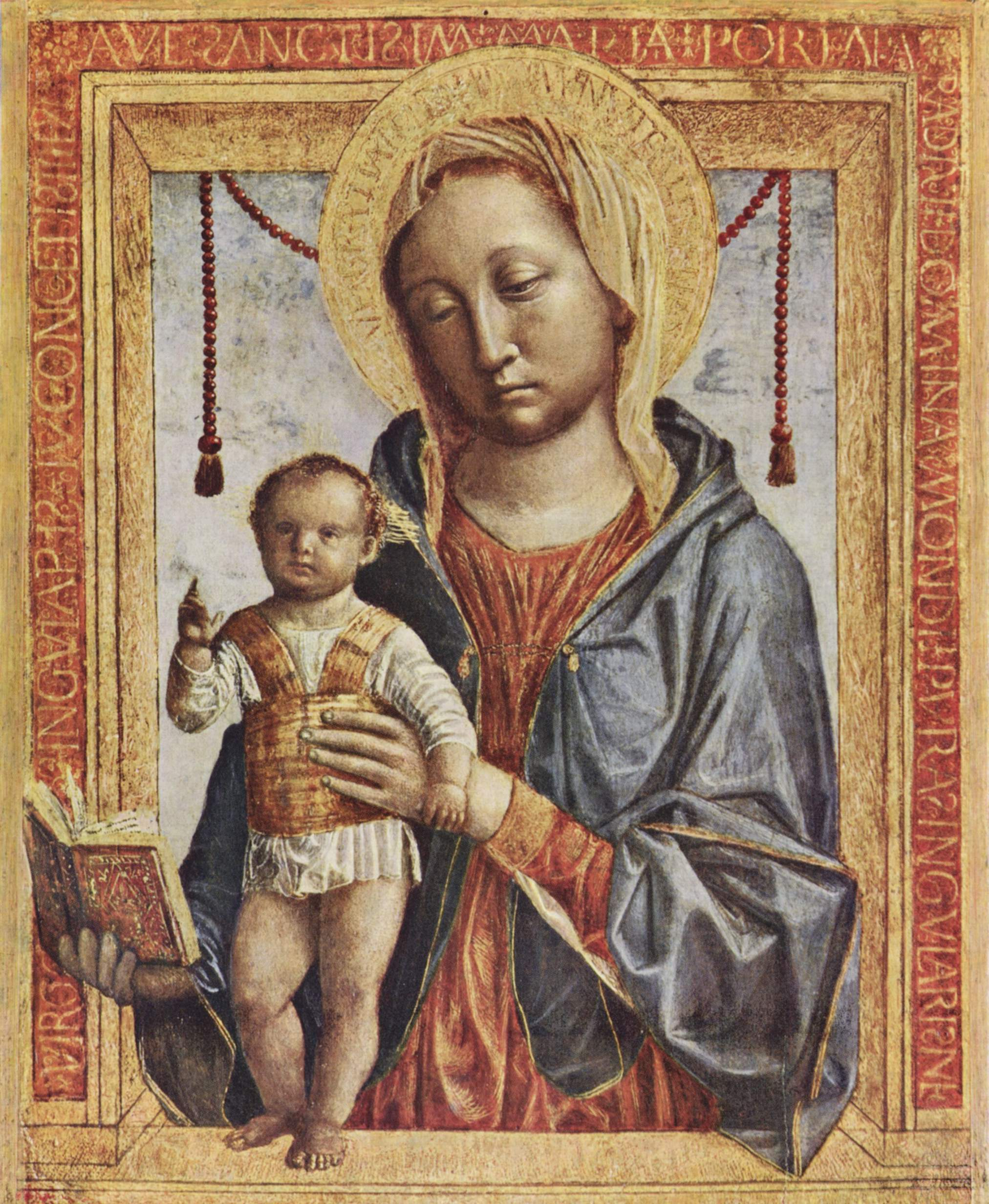

Madonna and Child with a Book is a c.1475 tempera on panel painting by Vincenzo Foppa. In 1863 Antonio Guasconi left an extensive collection of art to the city of Milan, including this painting and it is now in the Castello Sforzesco in Milan.

The frame is inscribed with "AVE. SANCTISSIM(A). MARIA. PORTA. PA.RADIXI. DOMINA. MONDI. PURA. SINGULARISNE. VIRGO. SINGULARIS. TU. CONCEPISTI. IEXU...", the incipit of a prayer in honour of the Immaculate Conception, sometimes thought to have been written by pope Sixtus IV. The size of the work shows it was intended for private devotion.
