= Ambrogio Bergognone =

Italian painter

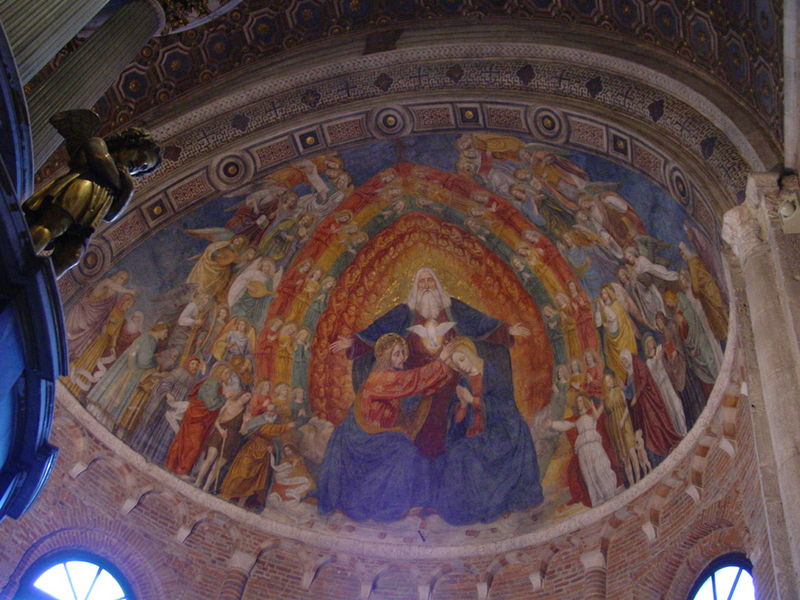
Fresco in the Basilica of San Simpliciano, Milan

Ambrogio Bergognone (variously known as Ambrogio da Fossano, Ambrogio di Stefano da Fossano, Ambrogio Stefani da Fossano or as il Bergognone or Ambrogio Egogni, c. 1453s – 1523/1524) was an Italian painter of the Renaissance period active in and near Milan.

== Biography ==
While he was nearly contemporary with Leonardo da Vinci, he painted in a style more akin to the pre-Renaissance Lombard art of Vincenzo Foppa and Bernardino Zenale. While the dates of his birth and death are unknown, he is said to have been born at Fossano, in Piedmont, and his appellation is attributed to his artistic affiliation with the Burgundian School. Only one known picture, an altarpiece at the Basilica of Sant' Eustorgio, is considered to be a verified example of his work before 1486.

Bergognone's fame is principally associated with his work at the Certosa di Pavia complex, composed of the church and convent of the Carthusians. Scholars consider it unlikely that he designed the façade of the Certosa itself, but he worked there for eight years. This work was undertaken in collaboration with his brother Bernardino Bergognone, with whom he furnished the designs of the figures of Mary, the saints, and the apostles for the choir stalls. These works were executed as inlaid woodwork by Bartolomeo Pola.

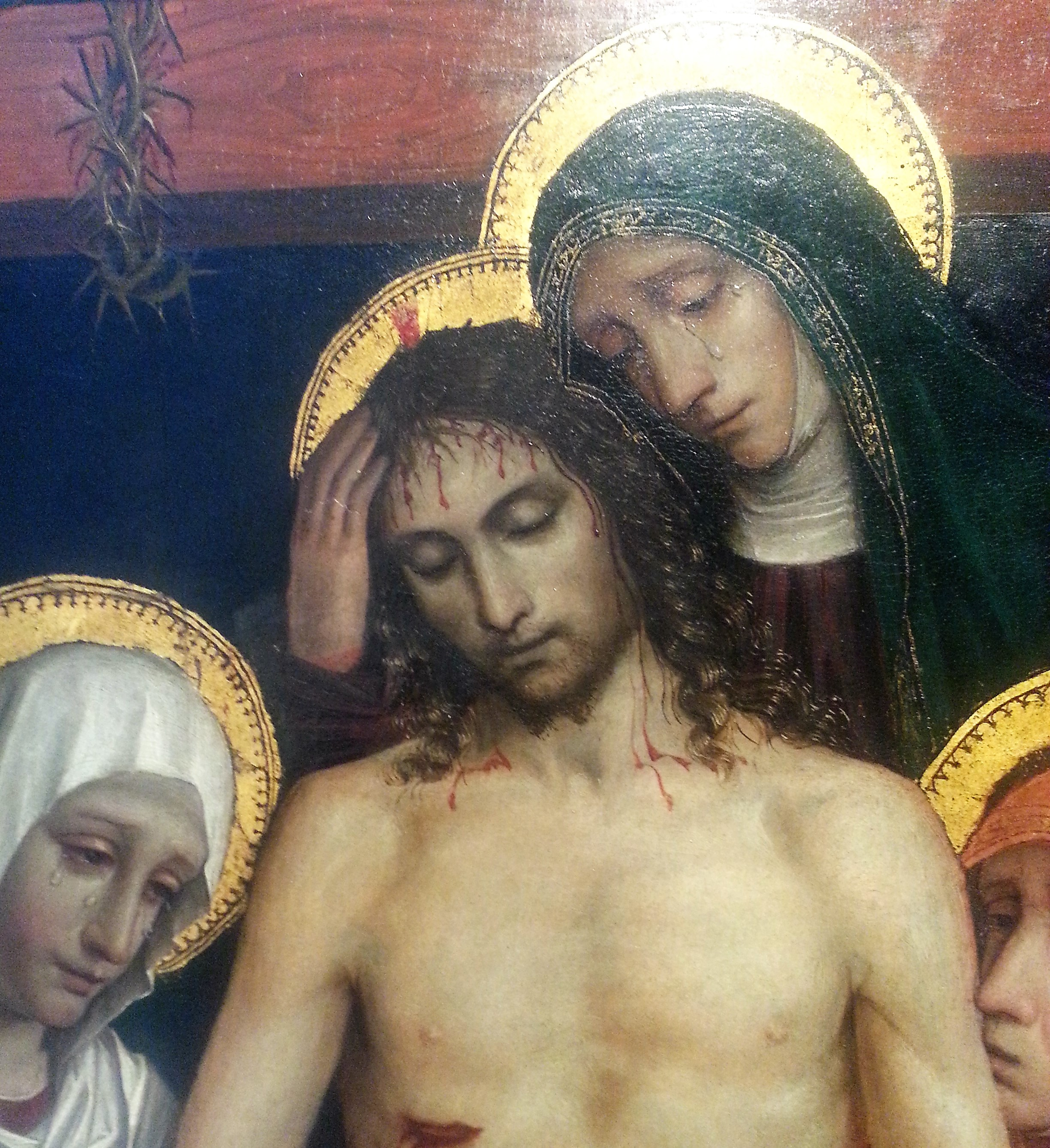
Cristo in pietà sorretto dalle donne, Accademia Carrara (detail)

In 1494, Bergognone returned to Milan. For two years following this return, he worked at the church of San Satiro. In 1497, he began work on paintings for the church of the Incoronata in the neighboring comune of Lodi. In 1508, he painted for a church in Bergamo. In 1512, his signature appears in a public document of Milan. In 1524, he painted a series of frescoes illustrating the life of St. Sisinius in the portico of San Simpliciano at Milan. These frescoes are his latest confirmed works. The National Gallery, London, has a number of his works: the separate fragments of a silk banner painted for the Certosa and a large altarpiece of the marriage of St Catherine, painted for the chapel of Rebecchino near Pavia. Art historians consider Bergognone to have had an influence on the work of Bernardino Luini.

== Gallery ==
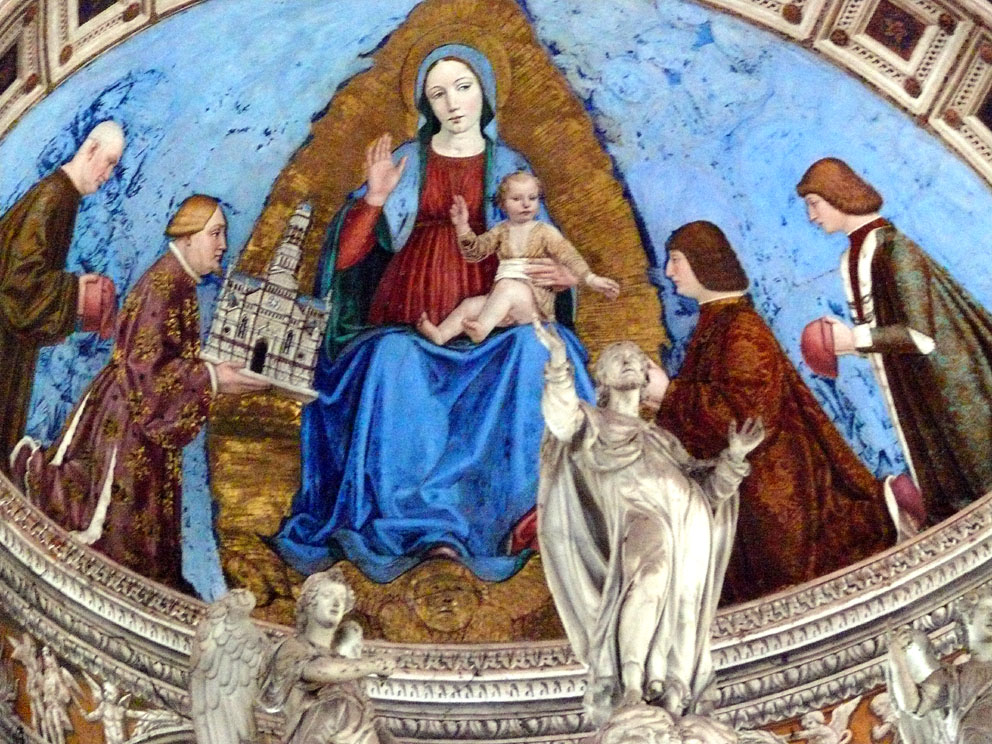
Gian Galeazzo Visconti (1351–1402), with his three sons, presents a model of the Certosa di Pavia to the Virgin (Certosa di Pavia).

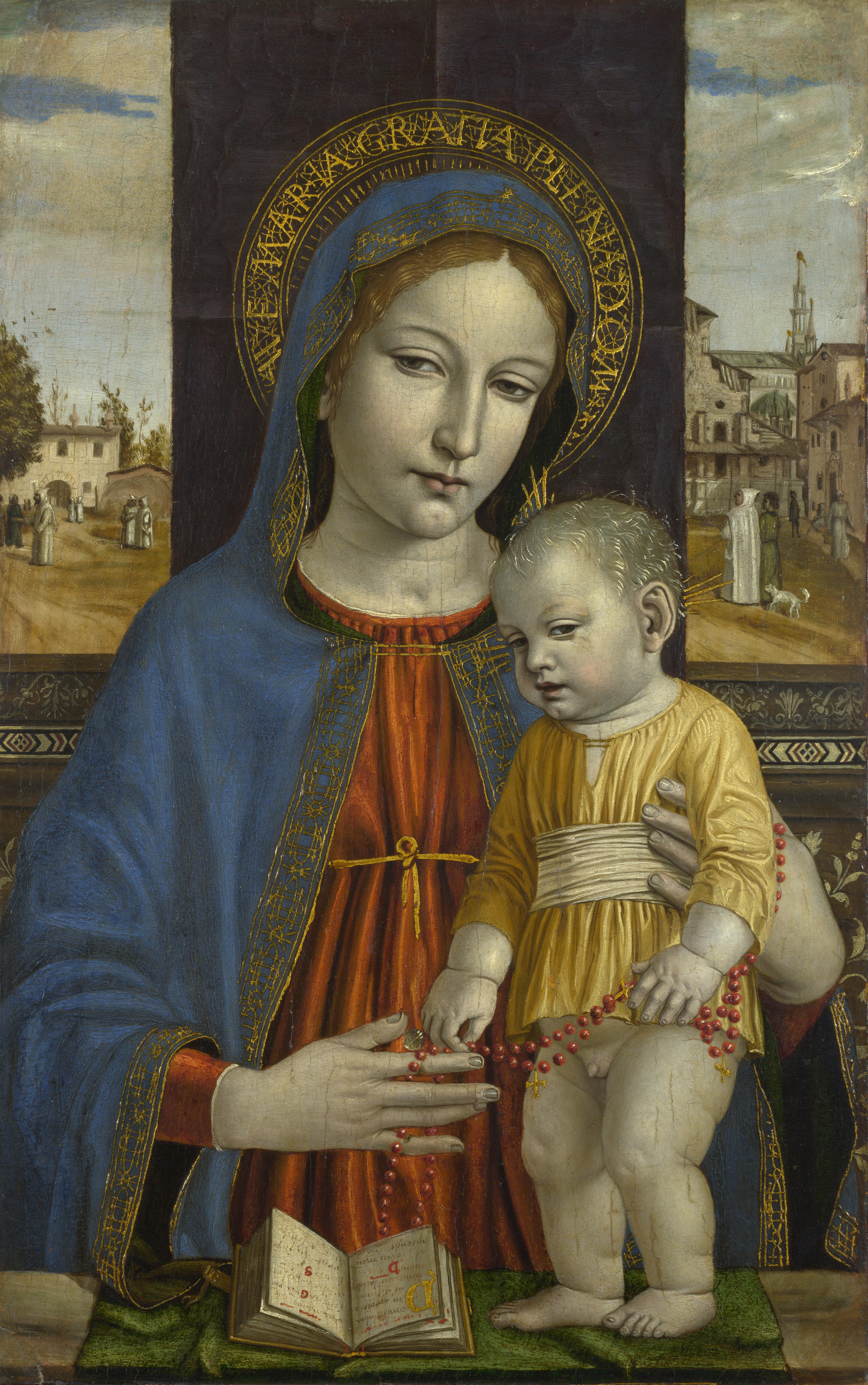
Madonna and Child (London, National Gallery)

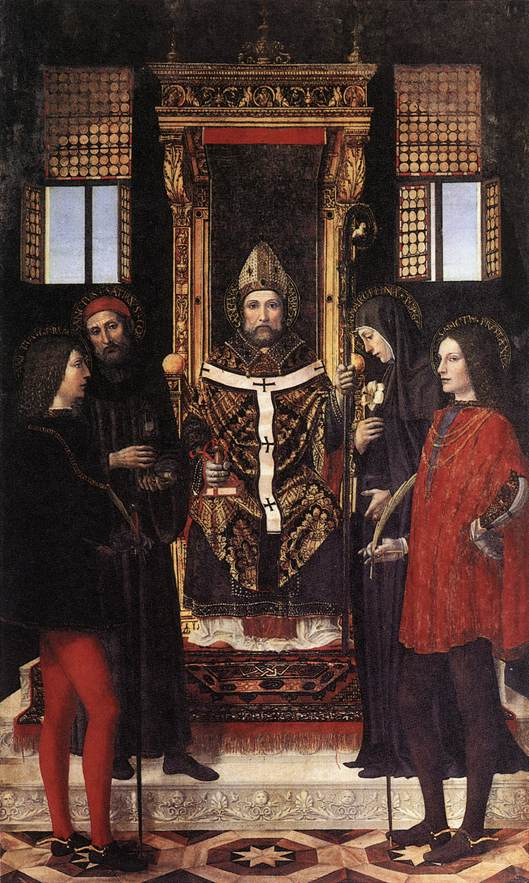
St. Ambrose and Saints (Certosa di Pavia)

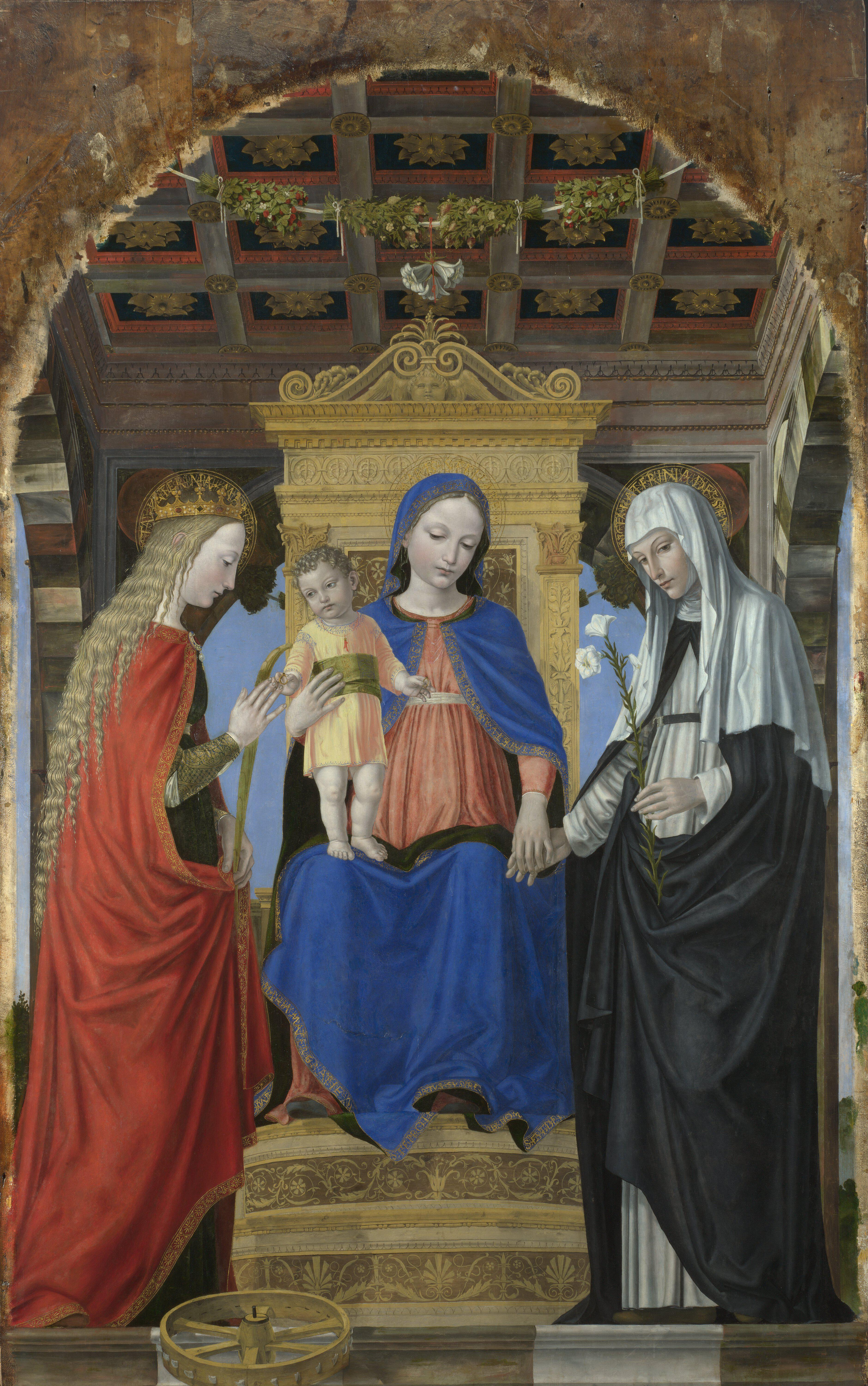
Mystic Marriage of St. Catherine of Alexandria and St. Catherine of Siena (London, National Gallery; from Certosa di Pavia)

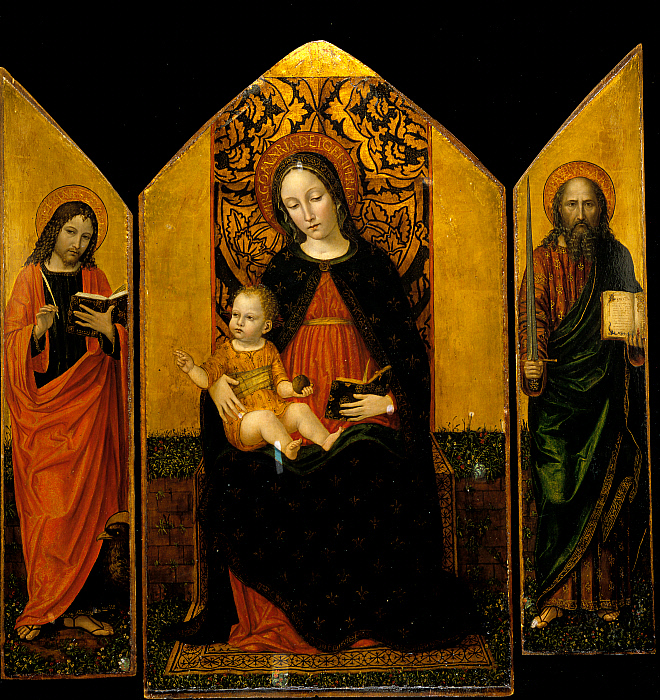
Style of Ambrogio Bergognone, Virgin and Child with Saints John the Evangelist and Paul (before 1750), Oil on panel, 37 5/8 in. (95.5 cm) Clark Art Institute

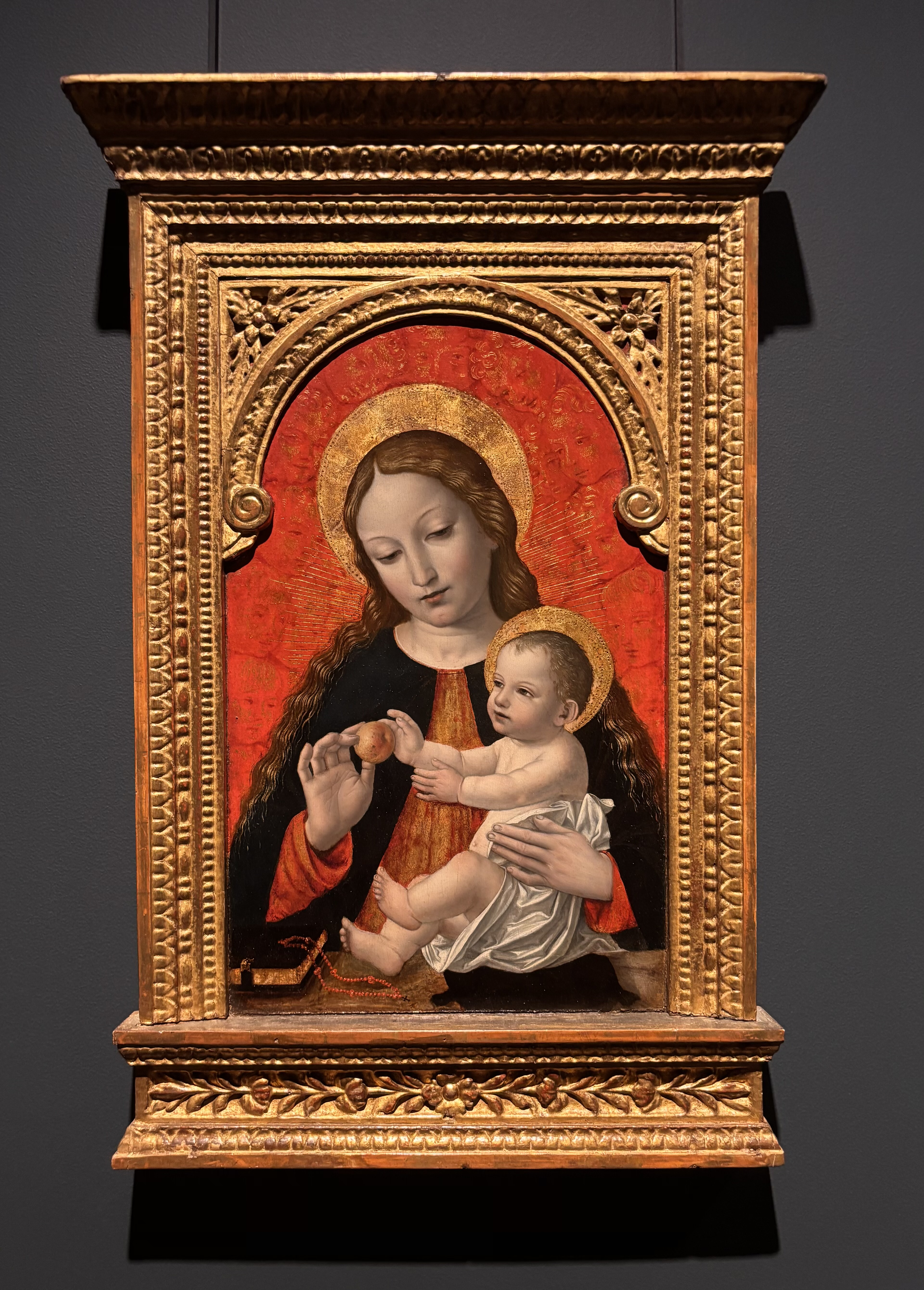
Madonna and Child (Accademia Carrara, Bergamo)
