= Venerius (bishop of Milan) =

Roman Catholic Saint; Archbishop of Milan from 400 (or 401) to 408

- Archbishop of Milan
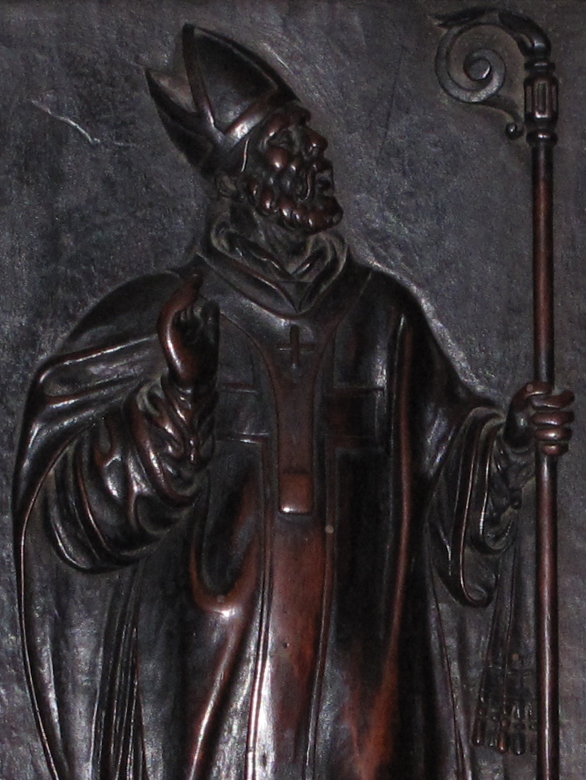
- Appointed: 400 or 401 AD
- Term ended: 408 AD
- Predecessor: Simplician
- Successor: Marolus

Personal details
- Born: c. 4th century AD Milan, Roman Italy, Roman Empire
- Died: May 4, 408 AD Milan, Roman Italy, Roman Empire

Sainthood
- Feast day: May 6
- Venerated in: Eastern Orthodox Church; Roman Catholic Church

Venerius (Italian: Venerio, born c. 4th century AD - died May 4, 408 AD) was Archbishop of Milan from 400 (or 401) to 408. He is honoured as a Saint in the Catholic Church and his feast day is May 6.

== Life ==
Almost nothing is known about the life of Venerius before his election as bishop of Milan. According to the 5th-century historian, Paulinus, Venerius was a deacon and he was present at the death of Ambrose in 397. Venerius was elected bishop after the death of Simplician in the winter between 400 and 401. He was already bishop of Milan when he received a request by a provincial synod held on June 18, 401 at Carthage to send in North Africa some clerics from Milan. One of the clerics sent was actually Paulinus.

Venerius is also known from a letter written to him by Pope Anastasius I concerning the condemnation of the ideas of the Origenists. He is also mentioned in a letter of the same pope to John II, Bishop of Jerusalem.

In 404 Venerius, along with Pope Innocent I and Chromatius, bishop of Aquileia, took a stand in favour of St. John Chrysostom who has been unjustly banned from Constantinople, writing in his favour to Honorius, the Western emperor, who sent this letter to his brother, Arcadius, the Eastern emperor. This intercession, however, availed nothing.

Venerius died on May 4, 408, and he was buried in the Church of Saint Nazarius and Celsus in Milan. A late tradition, with no historical basis, associates Venerius with the Milan's family of the Oldrati.
