= Mordant (disambiguation) =

A mordant is a substance used to bond dyes on to a material.

Mordant also may refer to:

== Substances ==
- Mordant, mixed acid compounds used in metalworking processes, especially etching
- Mordant, a type of sizing, a substance used for oil-based surface preparation for gilding

== Fiction ==
- Mordant, a fictional setting of novel series Mordant's Need
- Mordant, a fictional character from Mighty Morphin Power Rangers: The Movie (1995)
- "Mordant", a short story by Merab Eberle published in 1930.

== See also ==
- Mordaunt (disambiguation)
- Mordent
