= Vincenzo Foppa =

Italian painter (c. 1427–1430 – c. 1515–1516)

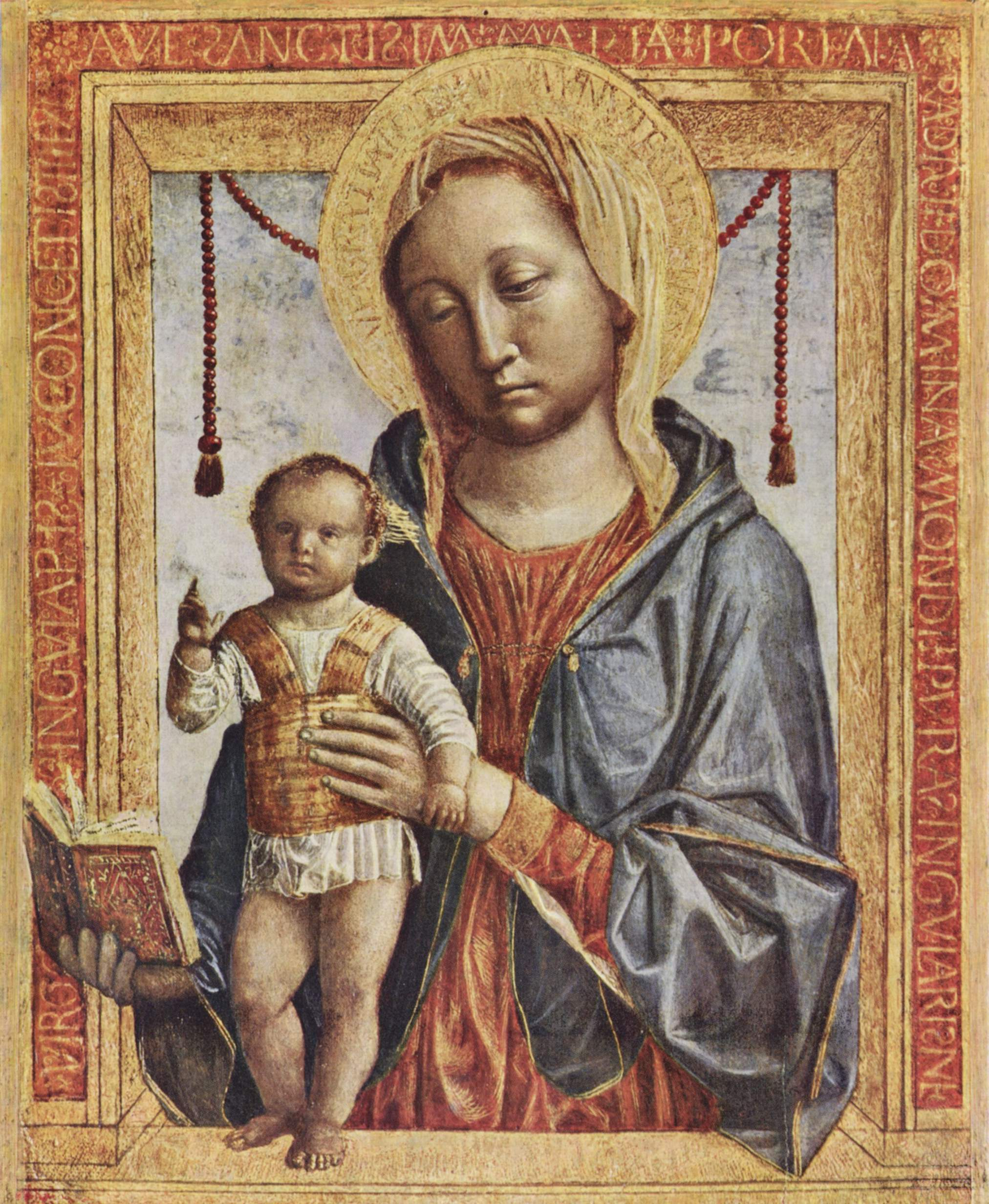
- Virgin of the Book c. 1475, Milan
- Born: Vincenzo Foppa c. 1427–1430; Brescia, Italy
- Died: c. 1515–1516 (aged 84–89); Brescia, Italy
- Notable work: Crucifixion; Portinari Chapel; The Young Cicero Reading; Adoration of the Kings
- Movement: Italian Renaissance

Vincenzo Foppa (Brescia, c. 1427–1430 – Brescia, c. 1515–1516) was an Italian painter from the Renaissance period. While few of his works survive, he was an esteemed and influential painter during his time and is considered the preeminent leader of the Early Lombard School. He spent his career working for the Sforza family, Dukes of Milan, in Pavia, as well as various other patrons throughout Lombardy and Liguria. He lived and worked in his native Brescia during his later years.

== Early life ==
Very little is known about the early life and training of Foppa. He was born in Brescia. At the time, there were few esteemed painters in the region, and the art scene in Brescia was lacking. It is therefore likely that Foppa had to seek artistic training elsewhere. Some of his earliest exposures to art were likely frescoes painted by Gentile da Fabriano in the Broletto Chapel in Brescia and the woven Annunciation by Jacopo Bellini. The latter artist was one of the strongest influences on him, and it is possible that Foppa was directly apprenticed to Bellini. He also may have been apprenticed to Bonifacio Bembo. Some historians suggest that Foppa may have had early training in Padua with Francesco Squarcione, though his earliest works are more stylistically reminiscent of Pisanello and Gentile da Fabriano. It is most likely that Foppa went to Verona for his training.

== Career ==
=== Early works ===
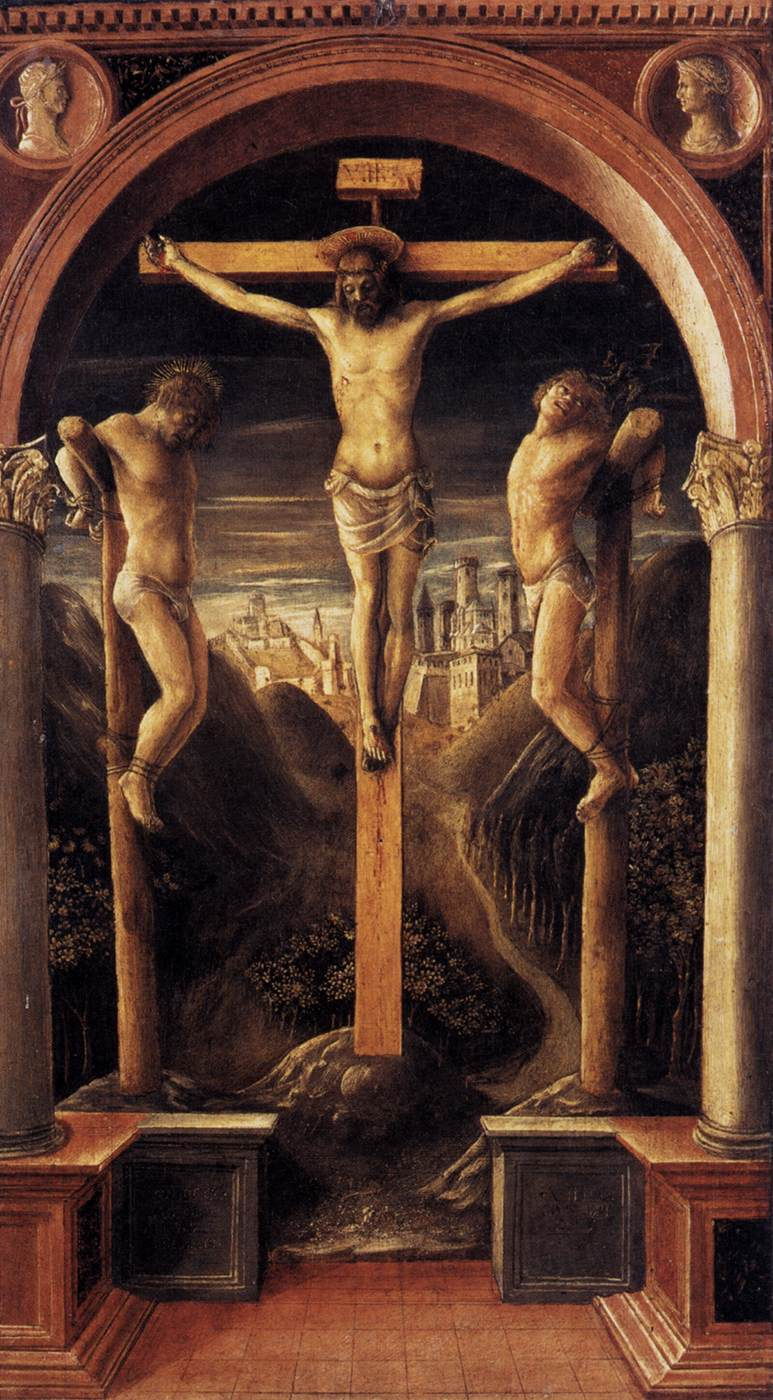
Crucifixion (1456)

The earliest known work attributed to Foppa is The Madonna and Child with Angels. Compositionally, this painting is reminiscent of the Veronese style due to its Gothic appearance, contributing to speculation that Foppa was trained in Verona, possibly by Stefano or Michelino da Besozzo. However, the piece also has unique aspects indicative of the artist's personal touch, such as the greyish skin tone, which would become a defining aspect of the Lombard school. However, the figures in The Madonna and Child with Angels are not nearly as lifelike as those featured in the painter's later works. The next work known to be by Foppa's hand is his Crucifixion, painted at Bergamo in 1456. This work marked a significant step forward for Vincenzo, as his representation of humans matured considerably between the completion of the Madonna and the Crucifixion. The painting is exceedingly similar to a Jacopo Bellini work of the same name, lending credibility to the notion that Foppa may have spent time training with Bellini in Venice. The work also uses elements associated with the Veronese school, such as the hilly landscape and fictional city featured in the background. While the composition is nearly identical to the earlier Bellini work, Foppa's delicate colouring and advanced naturalist depiction of the three crucified men indicate his considerable talent, even at such an early stage of his career.

=== Pavia and Genoa ===
By 1456, Vincenzo Foppa was working independently as an artist and had likely moved to Pavia, where he was living by 1458 at the latest. By this time, he had married a fellow Brescian by the name of Caylina, the daughter of Caterina de Bolis of Cremona, and had children with her. The art community in Pavia was more developed than that in Brescia, although less so than in Milan thanks to the leadership of Michelino da Besozzo. At some point, Foppa was contracted by the Sforza family to work in Pavia. This arrangement was likely facilitated by Bartolomeo Gadio, overseer in chief for the Duke, and Foppa likely worked first on the Castello of Pavia. While it is unclear what works Foppa was specifically enlisted for, he clearly made a strong impression on Duke Francesco Sforza. Vincenzo received an effusively praiseful letter of recommendation from Sforza which enabled him to receive patronage from the Doge of Genoa and the priors of the confraternity of St. John for frescoes in the Chapel of St. John the Baptist in the Cathedral of Genoa. Foppa had gone to Genoa in 1461 to evade the plague present in Pavia at the time, returning to Pavia in 1462 with only the ceiling completed. He eventually returned to complete the Chapel in 1471, though all of his work there was lost in the 16th century. In the following year, Foppa painted a number of works that have since been lost, such as an altarpiece for the Chapel of St. Bernardino at Morimondo and frescoes from the life of the Blessed Isnardo of Vicenza in the Dominican Church of St. Tommaso at Pavia.

=== Milan ===
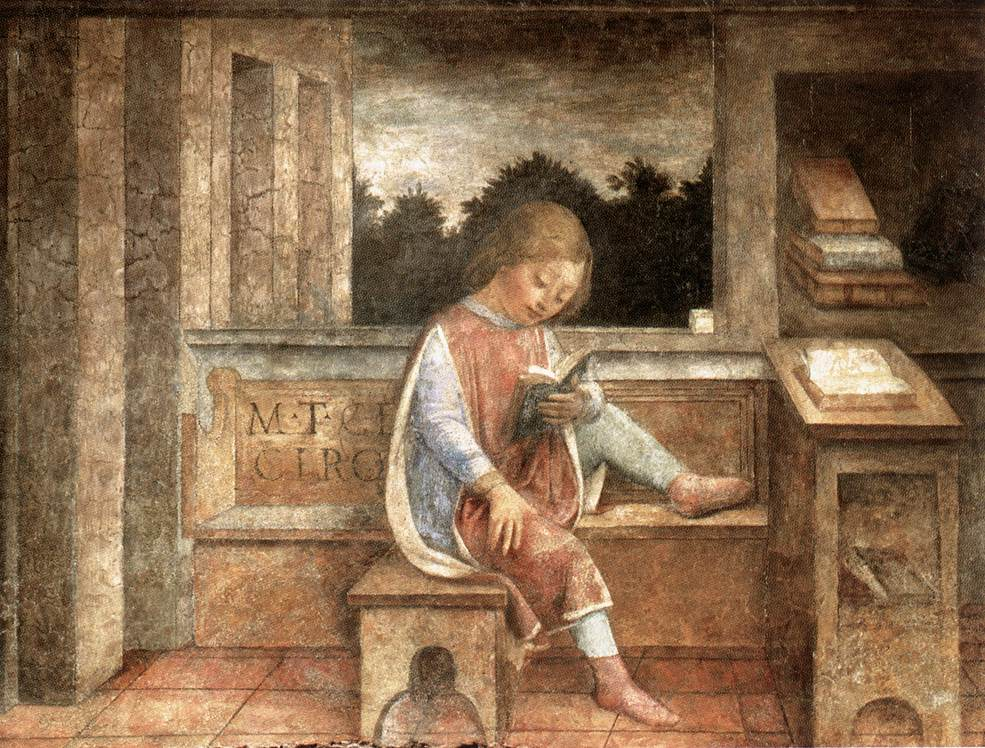
Boy Reading Cicero (c. 1464), Wallace Collection, London

In 1463, Foppa was called to Milan by Francesco Sforza to work on various projects. The first of these was a fresco for the portico of the new Ospedale Maggiore, depicting the Sforza family ceremonially laying the first stone for the hospital. The architect of the hospital was Filarete, who later honoured Vincenzo Foppa as one of the greatest painters of the era. Foppa was the only painter of Lombardy to receive this distinction. Following this, Foppa painted a series of frescoes to decorate the Medici Bank of Milan, a palazzo building gifted by Francesco Sforza to Cosimo de' Medici. His work there began in 1464, overseen by the representative of the Medici Bank in Milan Pigello Portinari, and was completed by 1467. The frescoes included a series of eight Roman emperors (including one of Trajan for which a provisional sketch still exists) and a portrait of Francesco Sforza and his family. The only surviving fresco from this building features a small boy reading, with the name Cicero engraved on the bench behind him. This work, titled The Young Cicero Reading, is the only known secular work by Foppa that survives today and is located at the Wallace Collection in London. The subject of the painting has been debated by historians, with suggestions including Gian Galeazzo Sforza (grandson of Francesco), Augustus' grandson, and Cicero himself.

In 1468, Foppa was again commissioned by Pigello Portinari to decorate the Portinari Chapel at Saint Eustorgio in Milan. The Chapel holds the remains of Saint Peter Martyr of Verona, and for a time held those of Portinari himself. While it is not certain that Foppa painted the Chapel himself, the fresco cycle Life of St. Peter Martyr is commonly attributed to him. His work in the Chapel also includes a Doctors of the Church cycle, busts of saints, and an Annunciation. The rainbow decoration of the ribbed dome likely represents a "Beatific Vision" of arrival in paradise, with the rainbow signifying God and implying Portinari's piety. The frescoes in the Chapel display an advanced and creative use of perspective by Foppa, featuring vanishing points outside of the composition. Combined with his use of light and placement of the scenes in everyday settings, this "Lombard perspective" makes the scenes come to life.

After the death of his father Francesco, Duke Galeazzo Maria Sforza continued his family's close relationship with Foppa, first commissioning an altarpiece at Monza in 1466 and making him a member of the ducal household in 1468. Upon a request from Foppa in 1468, the new Duke granted him citizenship in Pavia and safe conduct for six years, allowing the painter to move about Milanese territorial holdings without tolls or taxes.

Foppa returned to Brescia to paint an altarpiece for the Church of Saint Maria Maddalena in 1472 but had returned to Milan by 1473. Several surviving Madonnas were likely completed around this period, or at some point in the 1460s. Some of these paintings are made to look almost like reliefs or sculptures, exhibiting the influence that sculptors such as Donatello.

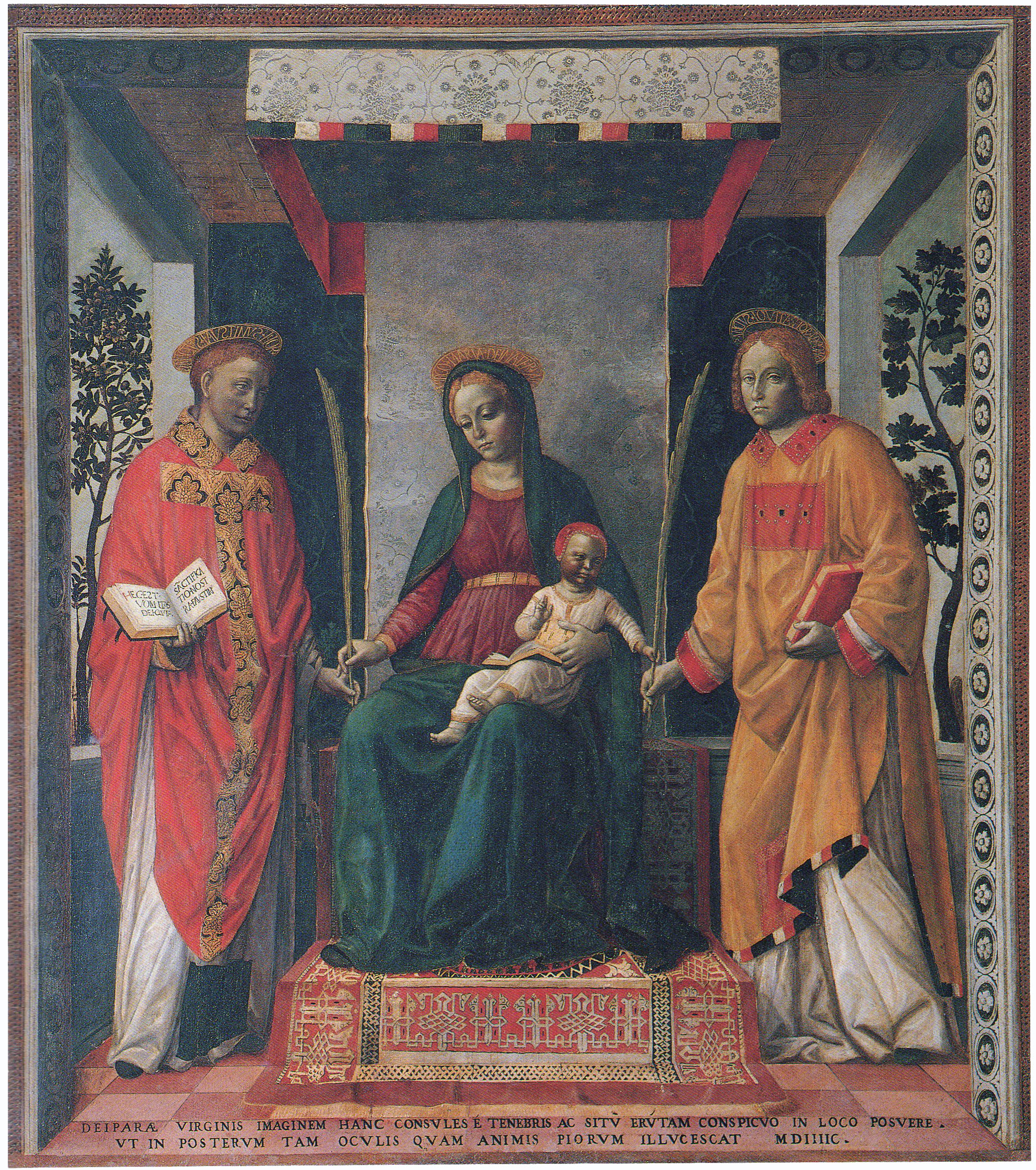
Virgin and Child with Saints (c. 1476)

=== Pavia ===
In 1474, Foppa collaborated with Zanetto Bugatto and Bonifacio Bembo on an ambitious altarpiece for the Castello of Pavia, but work on the project was halted when Galeazzo Sforza was murdered in 1476. Some surviving panels have been speculated to be part of this Castello project. The trio also worked on various other commissions in Pavia. Foppa completed several ecclesiastical works during the latter part of the decade, including a number of works featuring the Virgin and Child. Foppa became renowned for these Virgin and Child works, which he continued to produce in the 1480s and for the rest of his career. Many of these pieces are nearly identically composed: Mary holding the baby Jesus in front of a curtain, landscape, or other similar background. Vincenzo did a number of works for Santa Maria di Brera in Milan, including a polyptych titled Virgin and Child with Saints finished around 1476 and a fresco titled Virgin and Child with Saints John the Baptist and John the Evangelist dated 1485. At Santa Maria di Brera he also completed a fresco of Saint Sebastian, a subject whom Foppa painted several times during the decade. By 1486, Foppa had completed the Bottigella Altarpiece in Pavia Civic Museums, which depicted Silvestro Bottigella and his wife genuflect in front of the Virgin Mary.

=== Later years ===
By 1489, Foppa was back in Liguria, completing a since-destroyed altarpiece for the Doria Chapel of the Certosa di Rivarola near Genoa in February. The following year Foppa completed another altarpiece, this one for the oratory of Santa Maria di Castello in Savona. This work was commissioned by Giuliano della Rovere, a recurring patron of Foppa during his time spent in Savona. In 1490, Foppa was granted a yearly allowance of 100 lire by Brescia in exchange for continued artistic contributions to the city, marking his return home. In the same year, he frescoed the central Loggetta of the town. He continued to work painting numerous devotional works during his remaining years, which he spent largely in his native Brescia as well as Pavia. His latest known work is dated 1514, and he is believed to have died in 1515 or 1516 in Brescia.

== Style ==
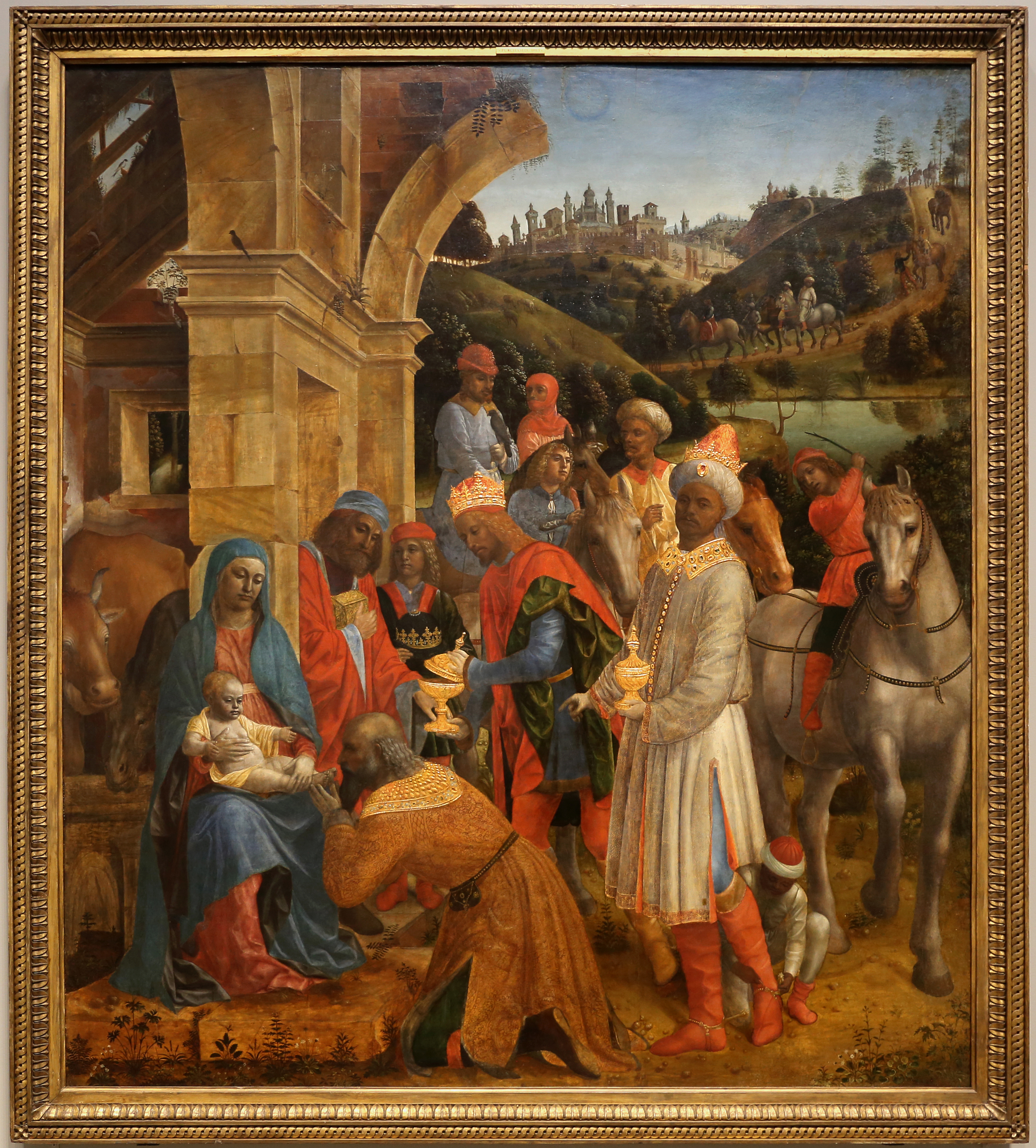
Adoration of the Kings (c.1500), National Gallery, London

Foppa's style was heavily influenced by Bellini, Pisanello, and Mantegna. His human figures are typically shown with a silvery-grey skin tone, a feature that has become the identifying quality of the Lombard school. This colouration gives the subjects an almost morbid appearance. Foppa was celebrated for his use of perspective, light and colouration. While contemporary documents label Foppa as an architect as well as painter, there are no known buildings or structures that he designed. In his Adoration of the Kings, likely painted around the turn of the 16th century, the artist used pastiglia, or paste-work, to provide the work with depth and brightness. He accomplished this by the sgraffito method, laying gold leaf under the area where the three Magi were located in the piece, painting them over the gold, and then scraping off paint to give their crowns and other adornments a genuine golden sheen. The vast majority of Foppa's known works are religious in subject, with a particular focus on paintings of the Virgin with Child. He did not venture far into other subject matters, although due to his dependence on commissions, this may not have been a personal choice. However, this limited scope is likely biased due to which works have survived the centuries, as many of his fresco cycles have been lost to history, and most surviving works are small devotional pieces or altarpiece panels.

== Legacy ==
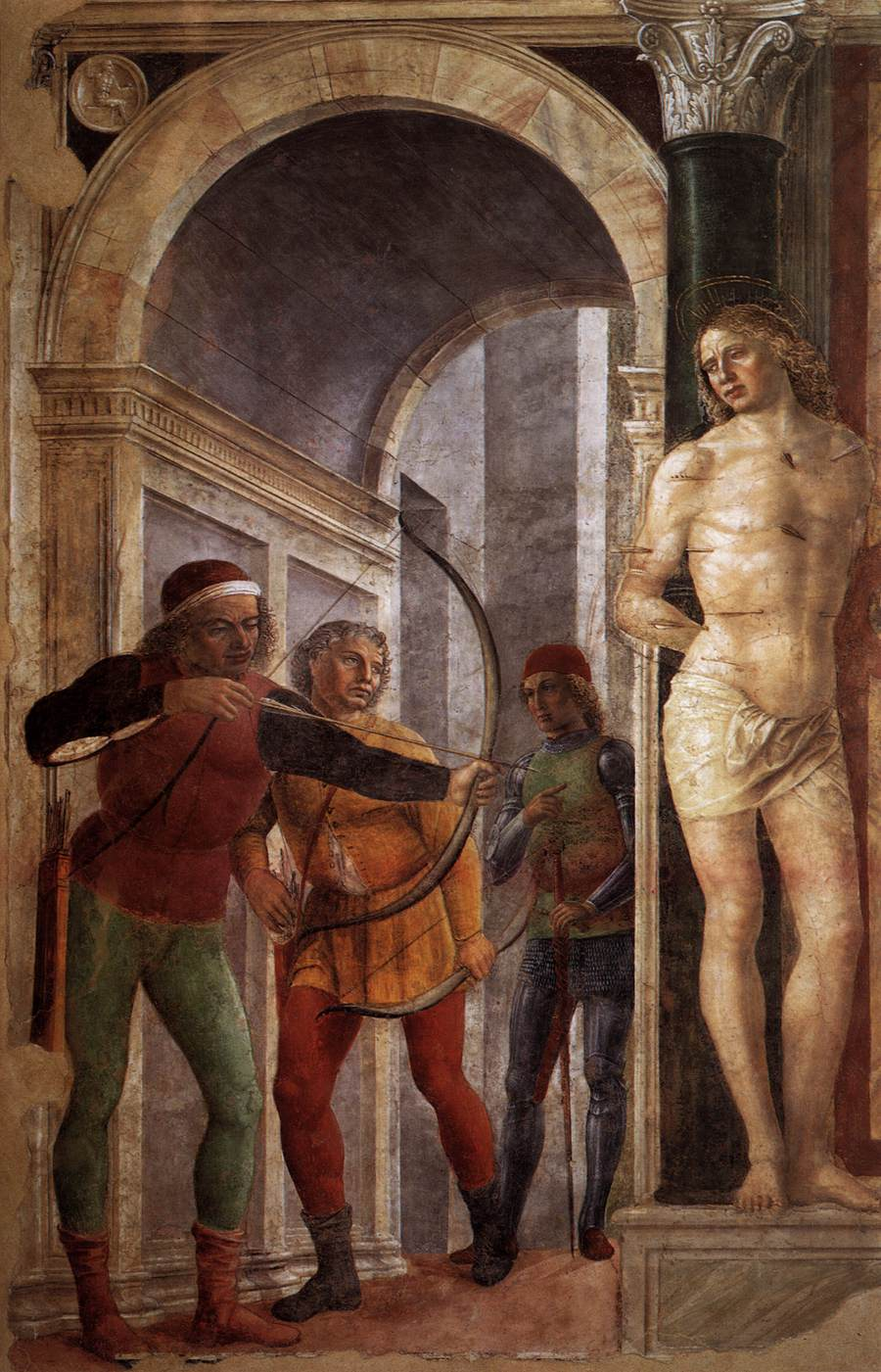
Martyrdom of St. Sebastian (c.1485), Brera, Milan

Foppa was renowned as the greatest painter of his era in Lombardy and is considered the founder of the Early Lombard School. While art communities existed in Pavia and Milan before his arrival, it was his work that gave Lombard art an identity and a renewed vitality. During the peak of his career from the 1460s to the 1480s, he was the dominant influence on Lombard art, and contemporary documents testify to his highly esteemed reputation amongst both his patrons and the rest of the artistic community. Foppa was confident in his merit and ability to receive commissions, as he often left cities with jobs unfinished to pursue work elsewhere that he found more interesting or more lucrative. There is evidence showing that at times he had to be exhorted or pressured to complete more trivial works that did not interest him. There are multiple artists who exhibit significant influence by Foppa, including Vincenzo Civerchio, Ambrogio Bergognone, and Girolamo Romanino. His long-term influence was somewhat diminished due to the arrival of Leonardo da Vinci in Milan in 1482. Leonardo's massive persona and artistic influence diluted the importance of Foppa's style. His perception in modern times is also damaged by the sheer volume of his work that has been lost. While he was a prolific painter during his career, relatively few pieces painted by Foppa have survived into the modern era.

== Notable works ==
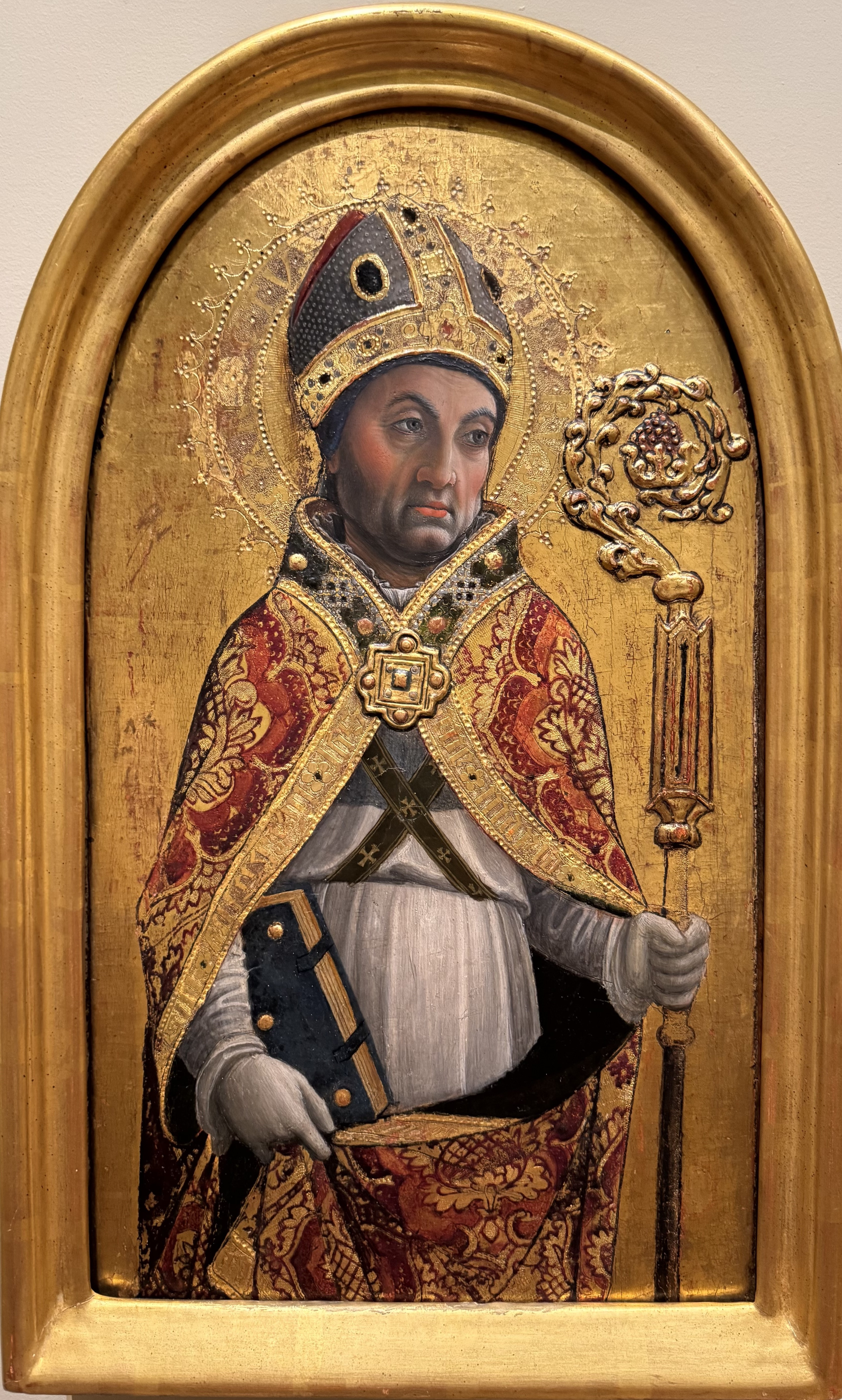
St. Sirus, created with three-dimensional elements in 1460.

- Madonna and Child with Angels, c.1450, Florence, Berenson Collection
- Crucifixion, 1456, Bergamo, Accademia Carrara
- St. Jerome Penitent, c.1460, Bergamo, Accademia Carrara
- Madonna of the Book, 1460–1468, Milan, Pinacoteca del Castello Sforzesco
- Madonna and Child, 1460–1470, Berlin, Staatliche Museen
- Boy Reading Cicero, c. 1464, London, Wallace Collection
- Frescoes of the Portinari Chapel, 1464–1468, Milan, Basilica of Sant'Eustorgio
  - Four Doctors of the Church
  - Eight Busts of Saints
  - Four Scenes from the Life of St. Peter Martyr :
    - Cloud Miracle
    - Miracle of the False Madonna
    - Miracle of Narni
    - Martyrdom of Saint Peter of Verona
  - Annunciation
  - Assumption of the Virgin
- St. Augustine, 1465–1470, Milan, Pinacoteca del Castello Sforzesco
- St. Theodore, 1465–1470, Milan, Pinacoteca del Castello Sforzesco
- St. Christopher, c.1470, Denver, Denver Art Museum
- Evangelists, 1477, Brescia, Carmelite Church of Santa Maria, Averoldi chapel
- Madonna and Child with an Angel, 1479–1480, Florence, Uffizi
- Bottigella Altarpiece, c.1486, Pavia, Civic Museums
- St. Francis receiving the stigmata and St. Giovanni Battista, 1488–1489, Milan, Pinacoteca del Castello Sforzesco
- Saint Sebastian, c.1489, Milan, Pinacoteca di Brera
- Madonna and Child in a Landscape, c.1490, Philadelphia, Philadelphia Museum of Art
- Altarpiece, c.1490, Oratory of Our Lady of the Castle, Savona, with Ludovico Brea
- Madonna and Child, 1490–1495, Milan, Museo Poldi Pezzoli
- Madonna and Child, 1492, Brescia, Chiesa di Santa Maria Assunta di Chiesanuova
- Martyrdom of St. Sebastian, c.1485, Milan, Pinacoteca del Castello Sforzesco
- Portrait of Giovanni Francesco Brivio, 1495, Milan, Museo Poldi Pezzoli
- Portrait of an Old Gentleman, 1495–1500, Philadelphia, Philadelphia Museum of Art
- St. Anthony of Padua, 1495–1500, Washington, National Gallery of Art
- San Bernardino of Siena, 1495–1500, Washington, National Gallery of Art
- Altarpiece of Santa Maria delle Grazie, 1500–1510, Milan, Pinacoteca di Brera
- Adoration of the Magi, c.1500, London, National Gallery
