= Mona Lisa (Hermitage) =

Mid-16th century painting

Hermitage Mona Lisa
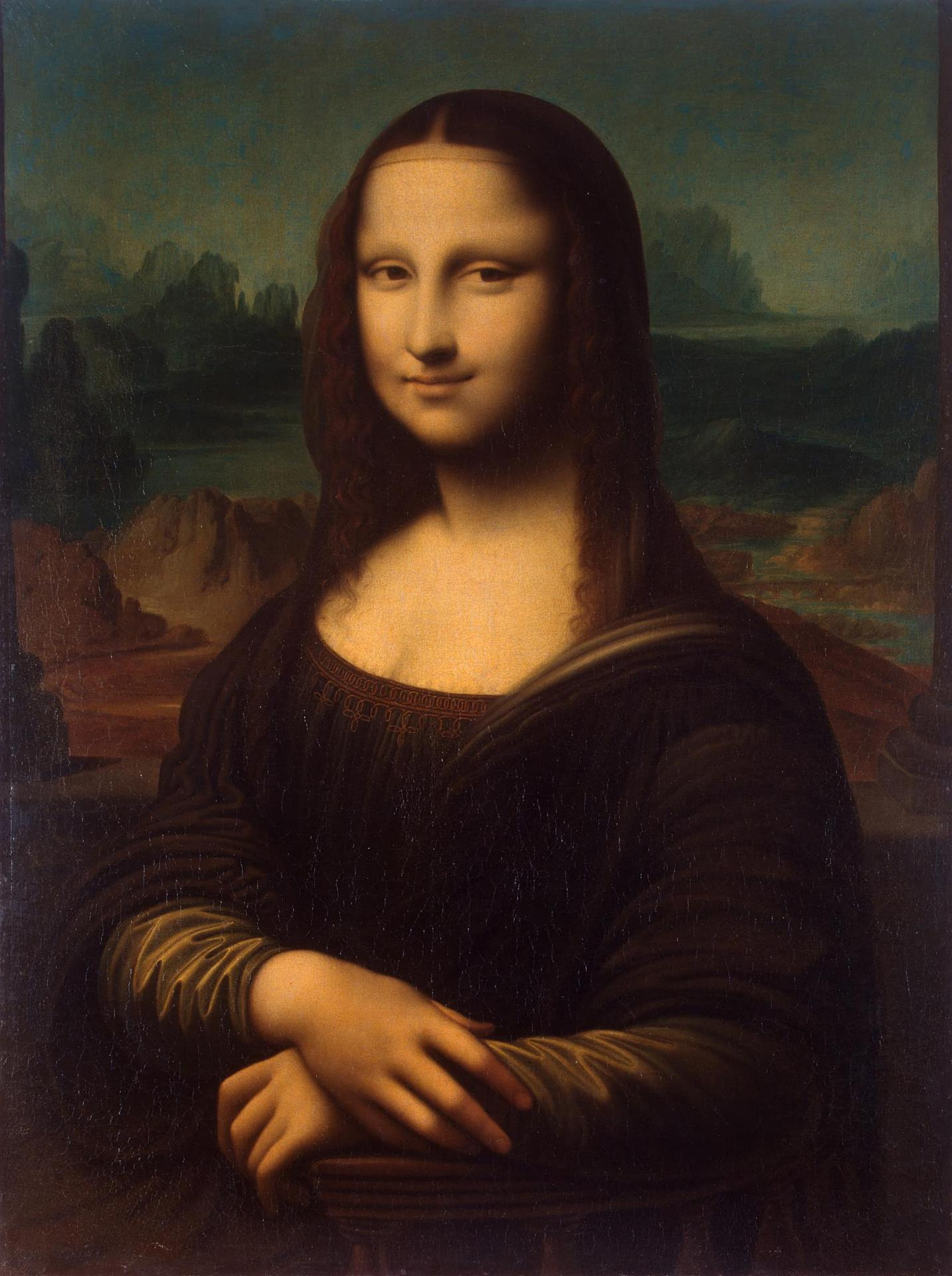
- Artist: Unknown
- Year: c. 1550
- Medium: Oil on canvas
- Subject: Lisa Gherardini
- Dimensions: 71 cm × 53 cm (28 in × 21 in)
- Location: Hermitage Museum, Peterburg

Hermitage Mona Lisa is a painting on canvas, which was made by an unknown painter in the mid-16th century and is located in the Hermitage Museum of Saint Petersburg. It was transferred from the Antikvariat All-Union Association and entered the Hermitage in 1931.

== Description ==
This is a portrait of Lisa Gherardini, best known as Mona Lisa or Gioconda, and is a clear copy of Leonardo da Vinci's early 16th century Mona Lisa. This version slightly differs from da Vinci's artwork, exhibited at the Louvre in Paris, and its good workmanship, legibility, and expressiveness have been pointed out. The execution of the portrait is presumably of Nordic Europe derivation, in particular German-Flemish.

The face of the model is younger than da Vinci's version, and the rear panorama presents two columns, which are barely visible in the original. Many have called this picture Gioconda with columns. Prominent columns are found in other copies such as Gioconda of Oslo in National Museum of Art, Architecture and Design, Gioconda of Baltimore in Walters Art Museum and Gioconda of Reynolds in Dulwich Picture Gallery.

== Analysis ==
Scientific analysis was carried out on the canvas and baryte, called barium sulphate in chemistry, was found. It is a mineral used for the preparation of the support, especially in the years ranging from 1620 to 1680, but when this substance was used, Leonardo had been dead for more than a century.

== See also ==
- Mona Lisa (Prado)
- Isleworth Mona Lisa
- Two-Mona Lisa theory
- Mona Lisa replicas and reinterpretations
