= William C. Paley =

American film producer (1857–1924)

Film of USS Indiana (1898)

William C. Paley (1857 – 31 May 1924) was an early cameraman and film pioneer. He worked with X-rays before health issues led him to switch to film projects. He built a film projector called the Kalatechnoscope. He was hired as a cameraman at Eden Musée filming a Passion Play. He then worked for Thomas A. Edison, Inc. and made many films related to the U.S. war effort against Spain in Cuba. The Library of Congress lists him as William Daly Paley. Paley traveled extensively in the U.S. making actuality films.

He was part of the business partnership Paley & Steiner that sold film equipment and produced films. His nickname was Daddy.

Paley's equipment was used to create a passion play that was exhibited in New York. Edison met it with a lawsuit asserting copyright infringement over his film technology. The play received newspaper coverage in part because of fraudulent claims it was filmed in Germany and captured the original production when it was actually a staged recreation.

Paley collaborated with Journal reporter Karl Decker and filmed the funeral procession of the U.S.S. Maine and also filmed the Rough Riders in Tampa.

He died on 31 May 1924.
