= Evangelina Cosio y Cisneros =

Cuban rebel (1877–1970)

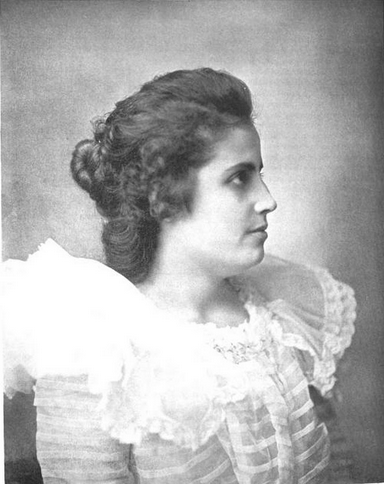
- Born: September 23, 1877; Puerto Príncipe, Captaincy General of Cuba, Spanish Empire
- Died: April 29, 1970 (aged 92)
- Known for: Wide interest in the United States press, as well as accusations of fraud and bribery
- Spouses: Carlos Carbonell (died 1916) Miguel Romero (m. 1918)
- Children: 2
- Parent(s): Augustín Cosio and Caridad de Cisneros y Litorre
- Criminal charges: Attempted murder and rebellion

Details
- Victims: José Berriz

Signature
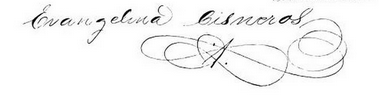

Evangelina Cosio y Cisneros (September 23, 1877 – April 29, 1970) was the focus of events that played out in the years 1896–1898 during the Cuban War of Independence. Her imprisonment as a rebel and escape from a Spanish jail in Cuba, with the assistance of the reporter, Karl Decker from William Randolph Hearst's New York Journal, created wide interest in the United States press, as well as accusations of fraud and bribery.

== Early life and background ==
Evangelina Cosio was born on September 23, 1877, in Puerto Príncipe, Cuba. She was the daughter of Augustín Cosio, who was an active participant in attempts to gain Cuban independence from Spain; Ms. Cosio's mother, María Caridad de Cisneros y de la Torre, died when Evangelina was a child. In 1895, the Cuban Revolution/War of Independence started under leadership of Cuban writer José Julian Martí in an attempt to overthrow Spanish rule.

In the summer of 1896, Augustín Cosio, as one of the rebel leaders, was captured and sent to a penal colony on the Cuban Isle of Pines (now known as Isle of Youth). Evangelina Cosio accompanied him along with one of her sisters. Initially the conditions on Isle of Pines were described by Ms. Cosio as relatively comfortable with Augustín living with his family in a small adobe house on the island. However, the arrival of a new governor, Colonel José Berriz, resulted in the imposition of imprisonment for the father. Evangelina appealed directly to the governor, but according to Ms. Cosio, he apparently mistook her pleas for something romantic. While there is much controversy as to the actual events, what is known is that the Colonel showed up at the young woman's residence one night, and after making what she considered inappropriate advances, a commotion ensued. The Colonel was briefly taken prisoner by associates of Evangelina, and he was in turn rescued by some of his troops. In short order she was charged with attempted murder and rebellion. Evangelina subsequently denied any plot, and claimed she was solely attempting to protect herself from the Colonel's advances. Cuban sources have suggested she was part of the rebel cause and the episode was indeed part of a larger attempt to free prisoners to join the revolutionary forces. The full truth is not known.

As a result of the incident, Evangelina Cosio was transferred from the Isle of Pines to a prison for women in Havana known as Casa de Recogidas, which had been given the reputation of being one of the most unpleasant jails in Cuba.

== Imprisonment ==
Cosio remained in that jail for over a year awaiting trial. News reports indicated she would be sentenced to 20 years on an even more harsh penal colony off the coast of Spanish Morocco. At this point, in June 1897, American journalists became involved, in particular Hearst's papers and his reporters in Cuba. Hearst had been actively pushing for American assistance of the rebels in Cuba. When his reporters in Cuba discovered what they described as a young, cultured and attractive Evangelina Cosio in the women's jail, Hearst had a cause to use to attract more readers in his circulation battle with his rival in New York, Joseph Pulitzer's New York World. This came during the high point of the so-called "yellow journalism" period when Hearst and Pulitzer were each attempting to outdo each other with ever more sensational news stories to attract the newly literate general public in New York. Commentators have suggested Hearst was determined to turn the affair into a damsel-in-distress story like that of the then popular medieval romances.

Hearst first tried to obtain Cosio's release with a letter and petition campaign that managed to enlist 15,000 signatures, including the mother of President McKinley and the widow of Confederate President Jefferson Davis. The entreaties to the Spanish government, including the Queen Regent of Spain, were unsuccessful. Alleged attempts by Hearst reporters to bribe Cosio out of jail resulted in the Journal's primary reporter in Cuba being deported.

== Escape ==
Hearst then decided to send another reporter to Cuba, Karl Decker, described as a swashbuckling "man of action," who was given the task of breaking the young woman out of her jail cell. He went to Cuba, gathered some associates to assist in the effort, including Cuban sympathizers and Americans fluent in Spanish. He also had assistance of some members of the U.S. Consulate in Havana, who helped with at least the tacit approval of the American Consul-General, Fitzhugh Lee, a former Confederate General and the nephew of Robert E. Lee. After Decker rejected a number of what appeared to be ill-advised schemes, including blowing a hole in the wall of the jail, Cosio devised a more realistic plan. The jail varied in height from two to three stories. Her third floor cell had a barred window that faced a flat area of the jail's roof. Cosio suggested drugging her jail-mates so they would sleep through the night and breaking out one of the bars to make her escape. Decker had a room rented in the building next door and at night had a ladder stretched from the roof of that building to the roof of the jail. He and his associates, over two nights, climbed over to the roof of the jail and sawed through one of the bars, which created a large enough opening for the slight prisoner to squeeze through and escape.

The young woman was taken to the home of one of the conspirators, Carlos Carbonell, an American educated, Cuban banker. After three days of hiding from the police-conducted searches, Cosio, dressed as a man, with her abundant hair stuffed under a large hat, and carrying an unlit cigar, walked through Havana to the dock, boarded a New York bound ship using false identification papers, and escaped to the United States.

== Response in America ==
Upon her arrival in New York, Hearst's stage-craft and directions continued the focus on the young woman and the Hearst reporter who helped in her escape. This included receptions at Delmonico's and Madison Square Garden, and later a meeting with President McKinley in Washington D.C. She then commenced a fund raising campaign for Cuban independence, while Hearst continued to trumpet the escape as a prime example of "Journalism that Acts." Rival newspapers suggested that a hoax, or at least bribery, was involved. Research in 2002 suggested these accusations were false.

Cosio's story faded with the rush of events, in particular the sinking of the American warship U.S.S. Maine and American's declaration of war on Spain, which ultimately resulted in Cuba's independence. However, commentators have said that the publicity around Cosio's story, and similar newspaper agitation, probably helped to prepare the American public for the war when it did come, making it what has been called one of the most popular wars the United States ever fought.

== Later life ==
Some months after her escape, Evangelina Cosio married one of her rescuers, Carlos Carbonell, who was 28 years her senior. They had two daughters. Carbonell died in 1916. In 1918, Evangelina remarried Miguel Romero, a Havana lawyer. Evangelina Cosio died on April 29, 1970, and was given a full military funeral by the Cuban government, as one of the last heroes of the Cuban War of Independence.
