= Speculations about Mona Lisa =

Theories regarding the da Vinci painting

Mona Lisa, by Leonardo da Vinci, Louvre Museum

The 16th-century portrait Mona Lisa, or La Gioconda (La Joconde), painted in oil on a poplar panel by Leonardo da Vinci, has been the subject of a considerable deal of speculation.

== Columns and trimming ==
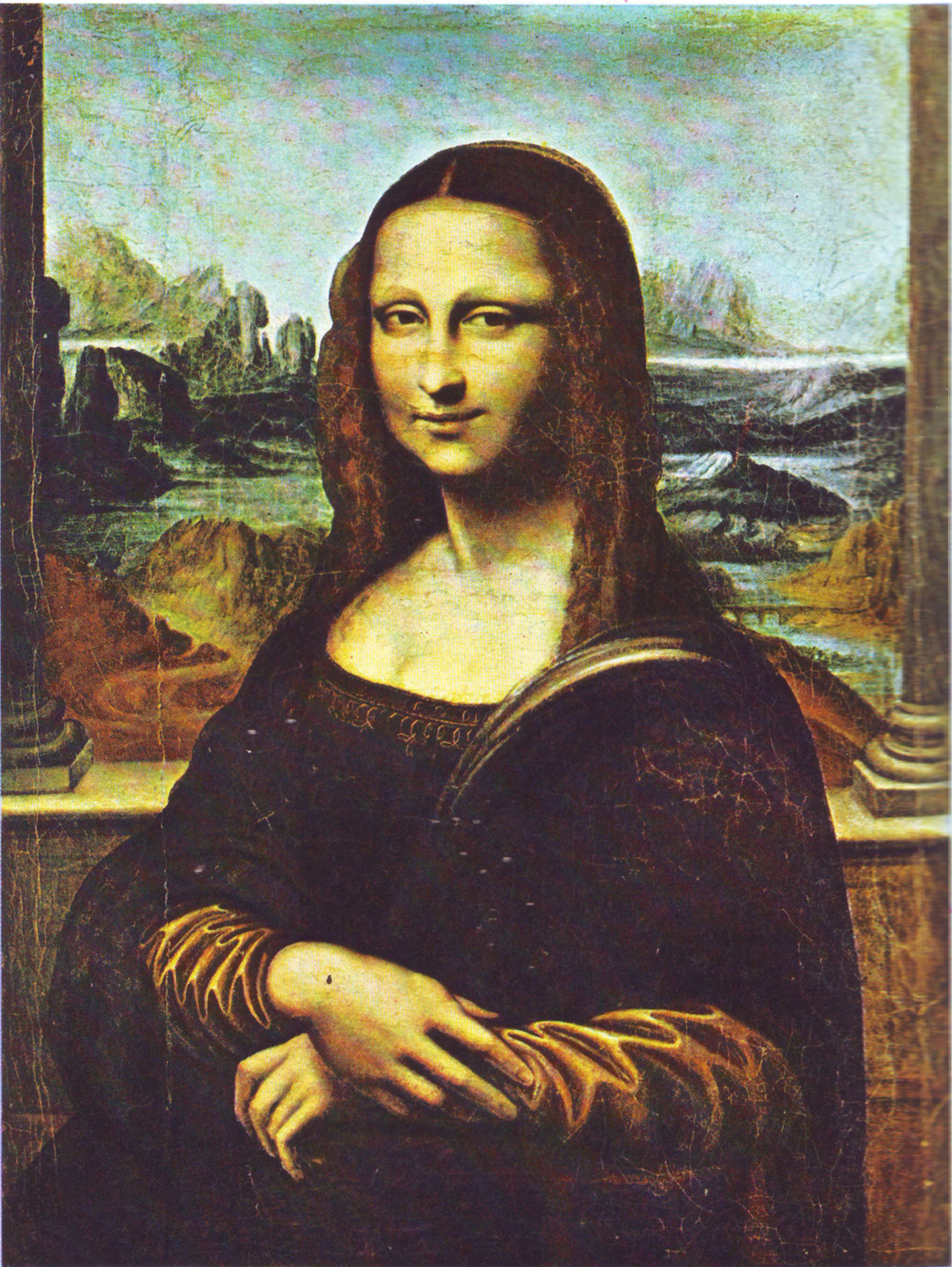
Early copy of the Mona Lisa at the Walters Art Gallery, Baltimore, showing columns on either side of the subject

It has for a long time been argued that after Leonardo's death the painting was cut down by having part of the panel at both sides removed. Early copies depict columns on both sides of the figure. Only the edges of the bases can be seen in the original. However, some art historians, such as Martin Kemp, now argue that the painting has not been altered, and that the columns depicted in the copies were added by the copyists. The latter view was bolstered during 2004 and 2005 when an international team of 39 specialists undertook the most thorough scientific examination of the Mona Lisa yet undertaken. Beneath the frame (the current one was fitted to the Mona Lisa in 2004) there was discovered a "reserve" around all four edges of the panel. A reserve is an area of bare wood surrounding the gessoed and painted portion of the panel. That this is a genuine reserve, and not the result of removal of the gesso or paint, is demonstrated by a raised edge still existing around the gesso, the result of build up from the edge of brush strokes at the edge of the gesso area.

The reserve area, which was likely to have been as much as 20 mm (0.79 in) originally appears to have been trimmed at some point probably to fit a frame (in the 1906 framing it was the frame itself that was trimmed, not the picture, so it must have been earlier), however at no point has any of Leonardo's actual paint been trimmed. Therefore, the columns in early copies must be inventions of those artists, or copies of another (unknown) studio version of Mona Lisa.

== Landscape ==
People of Arezzo in the Val di Chiana, a valley in Tuscany, have traditionally claimed the Mona Lisa landscape as theirs. An article published in the journal Cartographica suggests that the landscape consists of two parts which when placed together correspond to Leonardo's topographic map, the Val di Chiana.

== Other versions ==
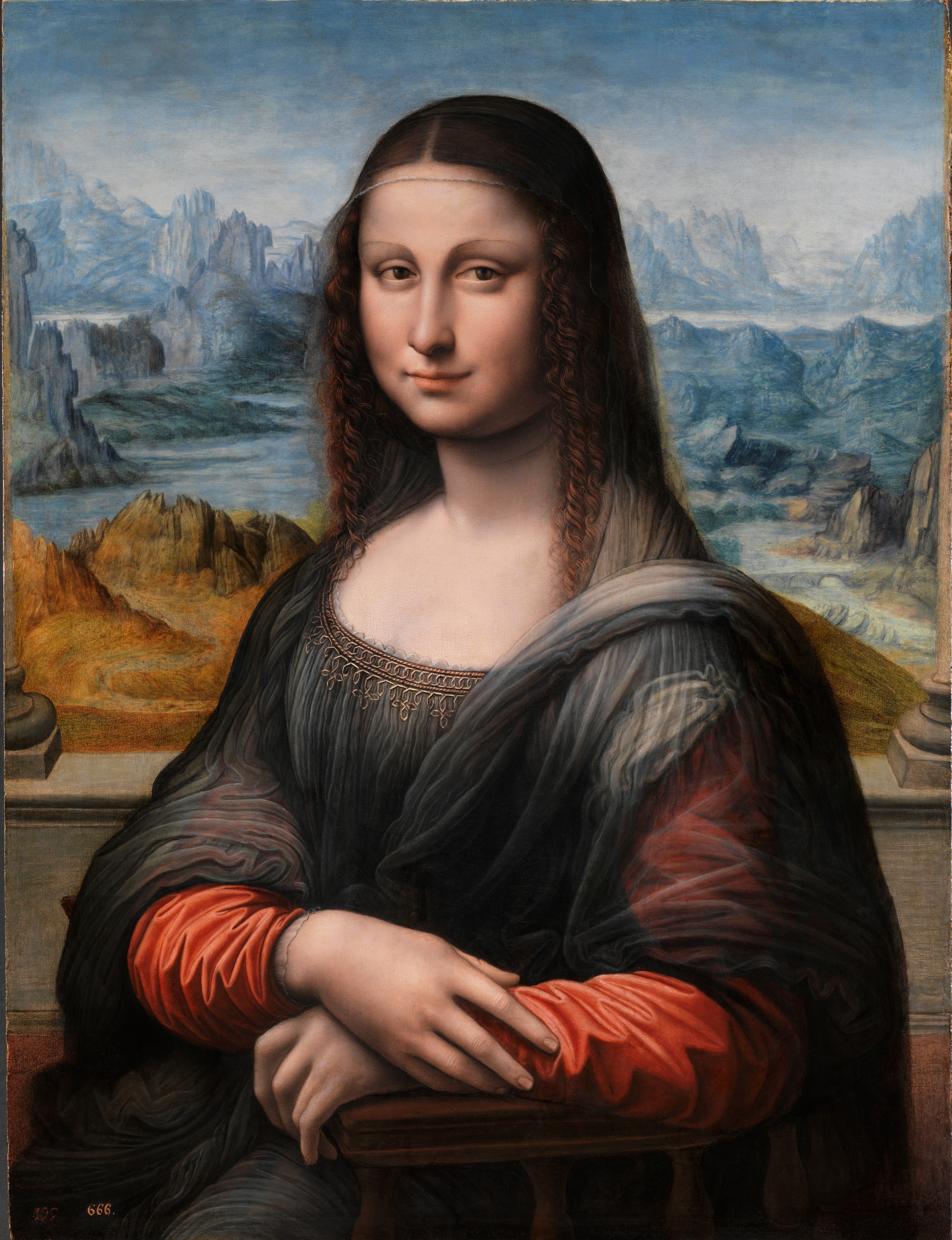
The restored copy of La Gioconda in the Museo del Prado, Madrid. The work is believed to have been made by an apprentice of Leonardo, at the same time as the original.

It has been suggested that Leonardo created more than one version of the painting. Another contender is the Isleworth Mona Lisa, which had been hidden in a Swiss bank vault for 40 years before being unveiled to the public on September 27, 2012. The Swiss Federal Institute of Technology in Zurich has dated the piece to Leonardo's lifetime, and an expert in sacred geometry says it conforms to the artist's basic line structures.

The same claim has been made for a version in the Vernon collection. The Vernon Mona Lisa is particularly interesting because it was originally part of the collection at the Louvre. Another version, dating from c. 1616, was given in c. 1790 to Joshua Reynolds by the Duke of Leeds in exchange for a Reynolds self-portrait. Reynolds thought it to be the real painting and the French one a copy, which has now been disproved. It is, however, useful in that it was copied when the original's colors were far brighter than they are now, and so it gives some sense of the original's appearance 'as new'. It is in a private collection, but was exhibited in 2006 at the Dulwich Picture Gallery.

In January 2012 Museo del Prado in Madrid found a copy of the painting, believed by a pupil of Leonardo, which may have been painted in Leonardo's presence. The copy gives a better indication of what the portrait looked like at the time, as the varnish on the original has become cracked and yellowed with age.

German imaging researchers Claus-Christian Carbon of the University of Bamberg and Vera Hesslinger of the University of Mainz performed further analysis of the Museo del Prado version, comparing it to Da Vinci's Mona Lisa, and in May 2014 speculated that, based on perspective analysis of key features in the images, the two images were painted at the same time from slightly different viewpoints. They further proposed that two images may therefore form a stereoscopic pair, creating the illusion of 3-dimensional depth, when viewed side by side. However, a study published in 2017 has demonstrated that this stereoscopic pair in fact gives no reliable stereoscopic depth.

== Nude versions ==
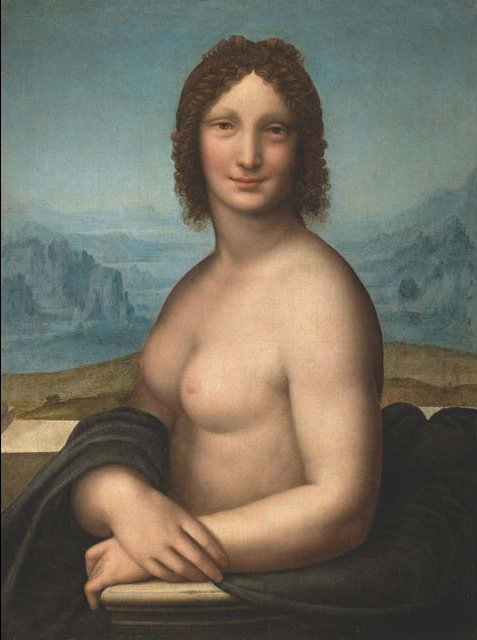
Salai's nude version

There are several copies of the image in which the figure appears nude. These have also led to speculation that they were copied from a lost Leonardo original depicting Lisa naked. These include:

- Salaì, Nude Woman (Donna Nuda). Oil on canvas, 86,5 x 66,5 cm. Hermitage, St Petersburg, Russia.
- Salaì, Mona Vanna. Louvre, Paris.
- Mona Vanna, 16th century, from collection of Napoleon's uncle Cardinal Joseph Fesch (1763–1839)
- La Belle Gabrielle, 16th century, from collection of Earl of Spencer, Northampton, England
- Carlo Antonio Procaccini, Flora, c. 1600. Accademia Carrara, Bergamo, Italy
- Joos van Cleve, Mona Vanna Nuda, National gallery, Prague
- Joos van Cleve, Portrait of a Woman, Rheydt Palace State museum
- Barthel Bruyn, Gioconda desnuda, 16th century

== Smile ==
Mona Lisa's smile has repeatedly been a subject of many—greatly varying—interpretations. Many researchers have tried to explain why the smile is seen so differently by people. The explanations range from scientific theories about human vision to curious supposition about Mona Lisa's identity and feelings.

Professor Margaret Livingstone of Harvard University has argued that the smile is mostly drawn in low spatial frequencies, and so can best be seen from a distance or with one's peripheral vision. Thus, for example, the smile appears more striking when looking at the portrait's eyes than when looking at the mouth itself. Christopher Tyler and Leonid Kontsevich of the Smith-Kettlewell Institute in San Francisco believe that the changing nature of the smile is caused by variable levels of random noise in the human visual system. Dina Goldin, Adjunct Professor at Brown University, has argued that the secret is in the dynamic position of Mona Lisa's facial muscles, where our mind's eye unconsciously extends her smile; the result is an unusual dynamicity to the face that invokes subtle yet strong emotions in the viewer of the painting.

In late 2005, Dutch researchers from the University of Amsterdam ran the painting's image through "emotion recognition" computer software developed in collaboration with the University of Illinois at Urbana-Champaign. The technology demonstration found the smile to be 83% happy, 9% disgusted, 6% fearful, 2% angry, less than 1% neutral, and 0% surprised.

== Infrared scan ==
In 2004, experts from the National Research Council of Canada conducted a three-dimensional infrared scan. Because of the aging of the varnish on the painting it is difficult to discern details. Data from the scan and infrared were used by Bruno Mottin of the French Museums' "Center for Research and Restoration" to argue that the transparent gauze veil worn by the sitter is a guarnello, typically used by women while pregnant or just after giving birth. A similar guarnello was painted by Sandro Botticelli in his Portrait of Smeralda Brandini (c. 1470/1475), depicting a pregnant woman, on display in the Victoria and Albert Museum in London. Furthermore, this reflectography revealed that Mona Lisa's hair is not loosely hanging down, but seems attached at the back of the head to a bonnet or pinned back into a chignon and covered with a veil, bordered with a sombre rolled hem. In the 16th century, hair hanging loosely down on the shoulders was the customary style of unmarried young women or prostitutes. This apparent contradiction with her status as a married woman has now been resolved.

Researchers also used the data to reveal details about the technique used and to predict that the painting will degrade very little if current conservation techniques are continued. During 2006, the Mona Lisa underwent a major scientific observation that proved through infrared cameras she was originally wearing a bonnet and clutching her chair, something that da Vinci decided to change as an afterthought.

== Eyebrows and eyelashes ==
One long-standing mystery of the painting is why Mona Lisa features very faint eyebrows and apparently does not have any eyelashes. In October 2007, Pascal Cotte, a French engineer and inventor, says he discovered with a high-definition camera that Leonardo da Vinci originally did paint eyebrows and eyelashes. Creating an ultra-high resolution close-up that magnified Mona Lisa's face 24 times, Cotte says he found a single brushstroke of a single hair above the left eye. "One day I say, if I can find only one hair, only one hair of the eyebrow, I will have definitively the proof that originally Leonardo da Vinci had painted eyelash and eyebrow," said Cotte. The engineer claims that other eyebrow hairs that potentially could have appeared on the painting may have faded or been inadvertently erased by a poor attempt to clean the painting. In addition, Cotte says his work uncovered proof that her hands were originally painted in a slightly different position than in the final portrait.

Giorgio Vasari's Lives of Artists describes the painting as having thick eyebrows; however, while this may mean that the eyebrows and lashes were accidentally removed, it could also mean that Vasari did not have first-hand knowledge of the work.

== Subject ==
Although the sitter has traditionally been identified as Lisa del Giocondo, a lack of definitive evidence has long fueled alternative theories. During the last years of his life, Leonardo spoke of a portrait "of a certain Florentine lady done from life at the request of the magnificent Giuliano de' Medici." No evidence has been found that indicates a link between Lisa del Giocondo and Giuliano de' Medici, but then the comment could instead refer to one of the two other portraits of women executed by Leonardo.

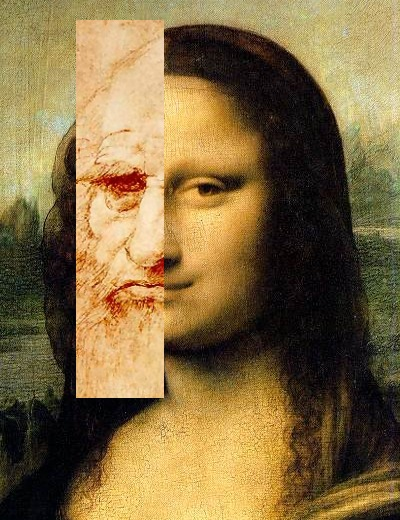
Comparison to drawing sometimes identified as Leonardo's self-portrait

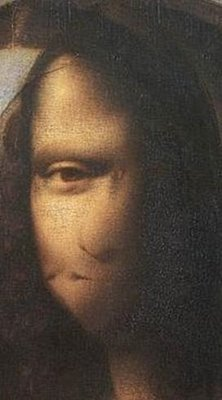
Leonardo's self-portrait obtained by stereoscopic observation

The artist Susan Dorothea White has interpreted the masculine proportions of Mona Lisa's cranial architecture in her anatomical artworks Anatomy of a Smile: Mona's Bones (2002) and Mona Masticating (2006). Lillian Schwartz of Bell Labs suggests that the Mona Lisa is actually a self-portrait. She supports this theory with the results of a digital analysis of the facial features of the woman in the painting and those of the famous Portrait of a Man in Red Chalk. However, the drawing on which Schwartz based the comparison may not be a self-portrait.

For Sigmund Freud the famous half-smile was a recovered memory of Leonardo's mother. In 1994 Leonardo's biographer Serge Bramly wrote, "there are about a dozen possible identifications of the sitter, all more or less defensible ... Some people have suggested that there was no model at all, that Leonardo was painting an ideal woman."

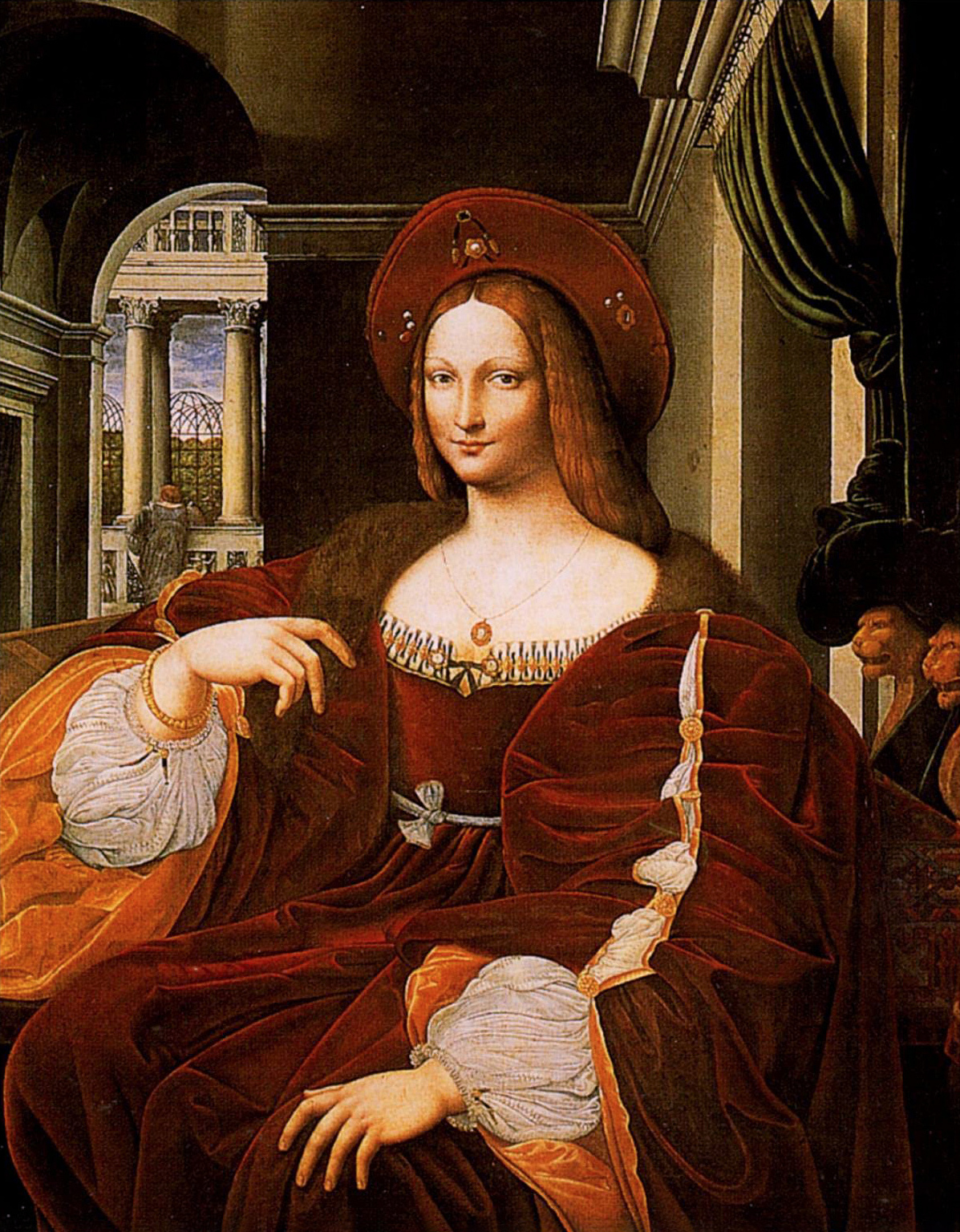
Isabella of Aragon, Giulio Romano (School of Raphael), Doria Pamphilj Gallery

In 2004, historian Giuseppe Pallanti published Monna Lisa, Mulier Ingenua (published in English as Mona Lisa Revealed: The True Identity of Leonardo's Model). The book gathered archival evidence in support of the traditional identification of the model as Lisa. According to Pallanti, the evidence suggests that Leonardo's father was a friend of del Giocondo: "The portrait of Mona Lisa, done when Lisa del Giocondo was aged about 24, was probably commissioned by Leonardo's father himself for his friends as he is known to have done on at least one other occasion." In 2007, genealogist Domenico Savini identified the princesses Natalia and Irina Strozzi as descendants of Lisa del Giocondo. Scan data obtained in 2004 suggested that the painting dated from around 1503 and commemorated the birth of the Giocondo's second son.

In 2011, art historian Silvano Vinceti claimed longtime apprentice (and possible lover) to Leonardo, Salaì, was the inspiration and figure for the painting.

In 2005 Heidelberg University academics discovered notes scribbled into the margins of a book by its owner in October 1503. These notes state that Leonardo is working "on the head of Lisa del Giocondo". This is seen by some as confirmation that a certain Lisa del Giocondo had been the sitter for the Mona Lisa. However, these notes offer no description of the painting or drawing and could be attributed to any female portrait of that time.

In 2011, after the discovery of old documents that indicated that Lisa del Giocondo was buried beneath a convent in Florence, an excavation was performed.

In 2014, Angelo Paratico suggested that Leonardo's mother (probably Mona Lisa) was a Chinese slave. It has also been suggested that she was a Middle Eastern slave.

=== Isabella d'Este theory ===
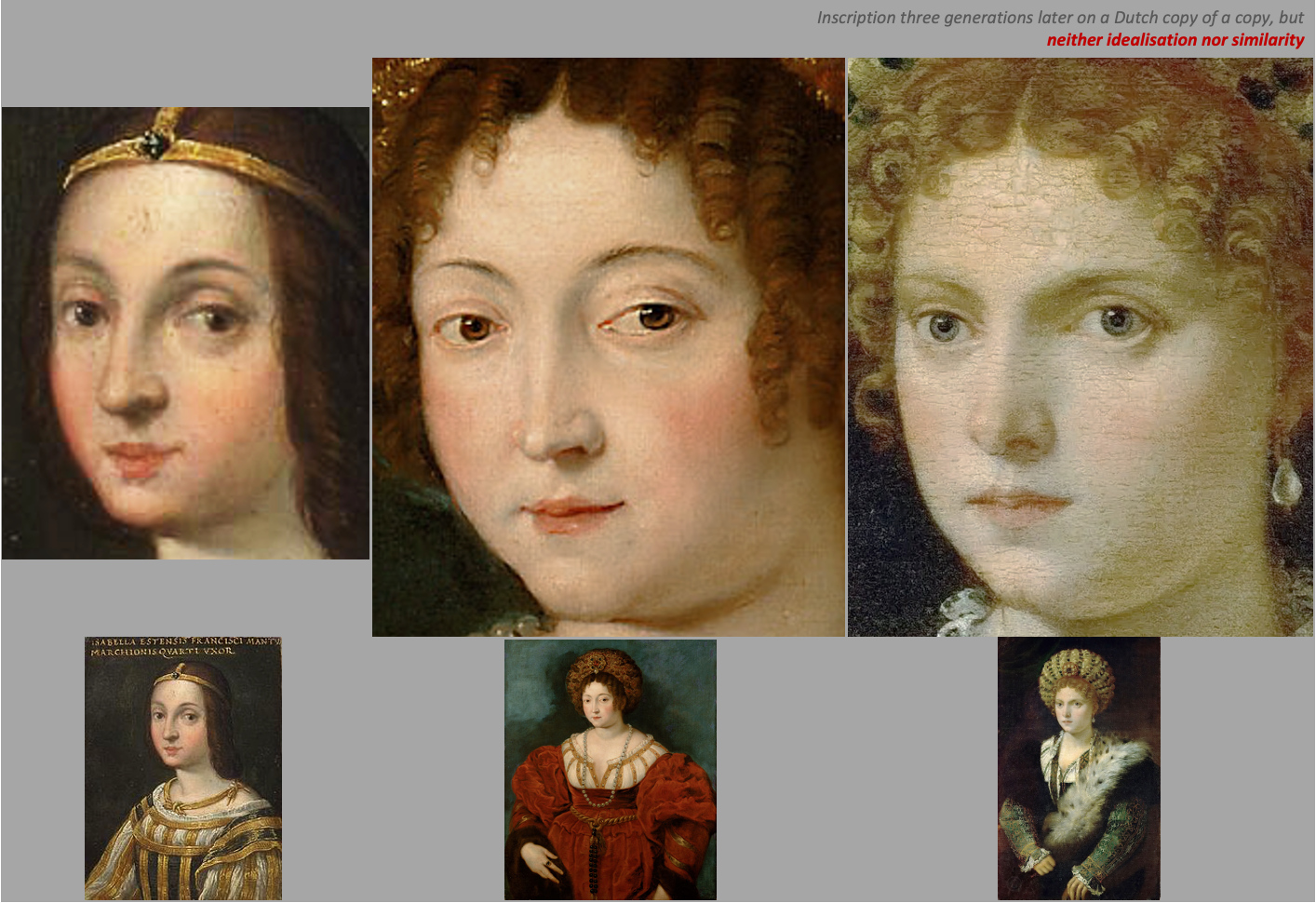
Colour portraits of Isabella d'Este in the Kunsthistorisches Museum, Vienna (perhaps including mix-up)

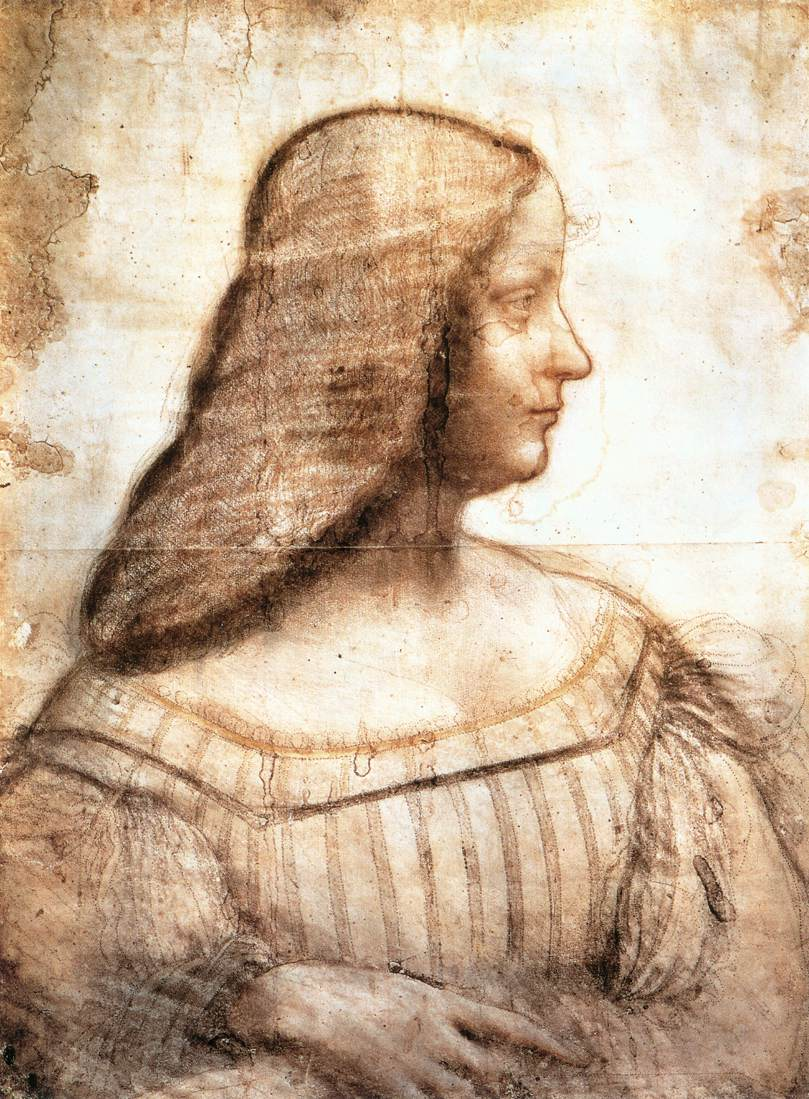
Profile drawing of Isabella d'Este by Leonardo

Isabella d'Este (1474–1539) was Margravine of Mantua and the most famous patron of the arts of her time. Leonardo was her sister Beatrice d'Este's court painter in the Duchy of Milan. In 1499, after the expulsion of the Sforza (his employers), Leonardo fled to the court of Isabella d'Este. Over a period of three months, Leonardo made several portrait drawings of Isabella (documented by letters). One of these drawings, a profile drawing, is preserved in the Louvre and shows similarities.

From the subsequent years 1501 to 1506, several letters survive in which Isabella—directly and through agents—pursued Leonardo with demands for the promised execution of the (oil) portrait (and her agents promised or also confirmed Leonardo's commencement). The Mona Lisa falls precisely within this period. In 1504 Isabella d'Este announced more interest in another motif, which is consistent with the whereabouts of the painting called Mona Lisa with Leonardo.

The hierarchical society of the Renaissance makes the portrait of an upper-class noblewoman more likely than the wife of a modestly merchant, especially for the Mona Lisa.

The Louvre's caveat is Isabella d'Este's alleged blonde hair. Yet Isabella's portraits Ambras miniature and Isabella in Red represent brown hair and also further similarities. Blonde hair is now only depicted in Titian's retrospective portrait Isabella in Black. Despite its circulation, this identification is disputed (outside the documentation of its own museum), as the head shows neither idealisation by beauty nor similarities with the two colour portraits mentioned above.

=== Metabolic disorders ===
In January 2010, Dr Vito Franco, professor of pathological anatomy at Palermo University, published research in an article in La Stampa newspaper and at a medical conference in Florence which suggested that the subject showed clear signs of xanthelasma, small accumulations of cholesterol-rich material under the skin, perhaps caused by problems in her biliary tract, due to hyperlipidemia, an inherited metabolic disorder. Dr Franco also suggested that she shows signs of having a lipoma behind her right eye.

=== Letters and identity of model ===
Some have seen a facial similarity between the Mona Lisa and other paintings, such as St. John the Baptist, sometimes claimed to be a portrait of Salai.

In December 2010, Italian art historian Silvano Vinceti reported that the Mona Lisa appears to have tiny letters and numbers in her eyes which are only apparent when viewed with a magnifying glass and shortly afterwards said that the model was Leonardo's male apprentice Gian Giacomo Caprotti (known as Salaì) and that the letters were clues to his identity. The Louvre, pointing out that he had had no access to the actual painting, said that after "every laboratory test possible" in 2004 and 2009 that "no inscriptions, letters or numbers, were discovered during the tests." and that "The ageing of the painting on wood has caused a great number of cracks to appear in the paint, which have caused a number of shapes to appear that have often been subject to over-interpretation".
