= Karl Decker (journalist) =

American journalist

Karl Decker, pen name Charles Duval, (died 1941, age 73) was a journalist in the United States who worked for William Randolph Hearst's New York Journal. He covered events leading up to the Spanish American War and helped Evangelina Cosio y Cisneros escape from a Spanish prison. Controversy over the events ensued. Amy Ephron wrote about the events in her book White Rose (2000).

Before the war, Decker collaborated with filmmaker William C. Paley, covering a funeral procession for those killed on the U.S.S. Maine.

After the war, Decker returned to Cuba in 1899. He covered severe storm aftermath. He also wrote about Cuba in 1933.

Later in his career, while working at the Saturday Evening Post, he made claims about who was responsible for the theft of the Mona Lisa.

== See also ==
- Yellow journalism#Origins: Pulitzer vs. Hearst
