= Louis Béroud =

French painter (1852–1930)

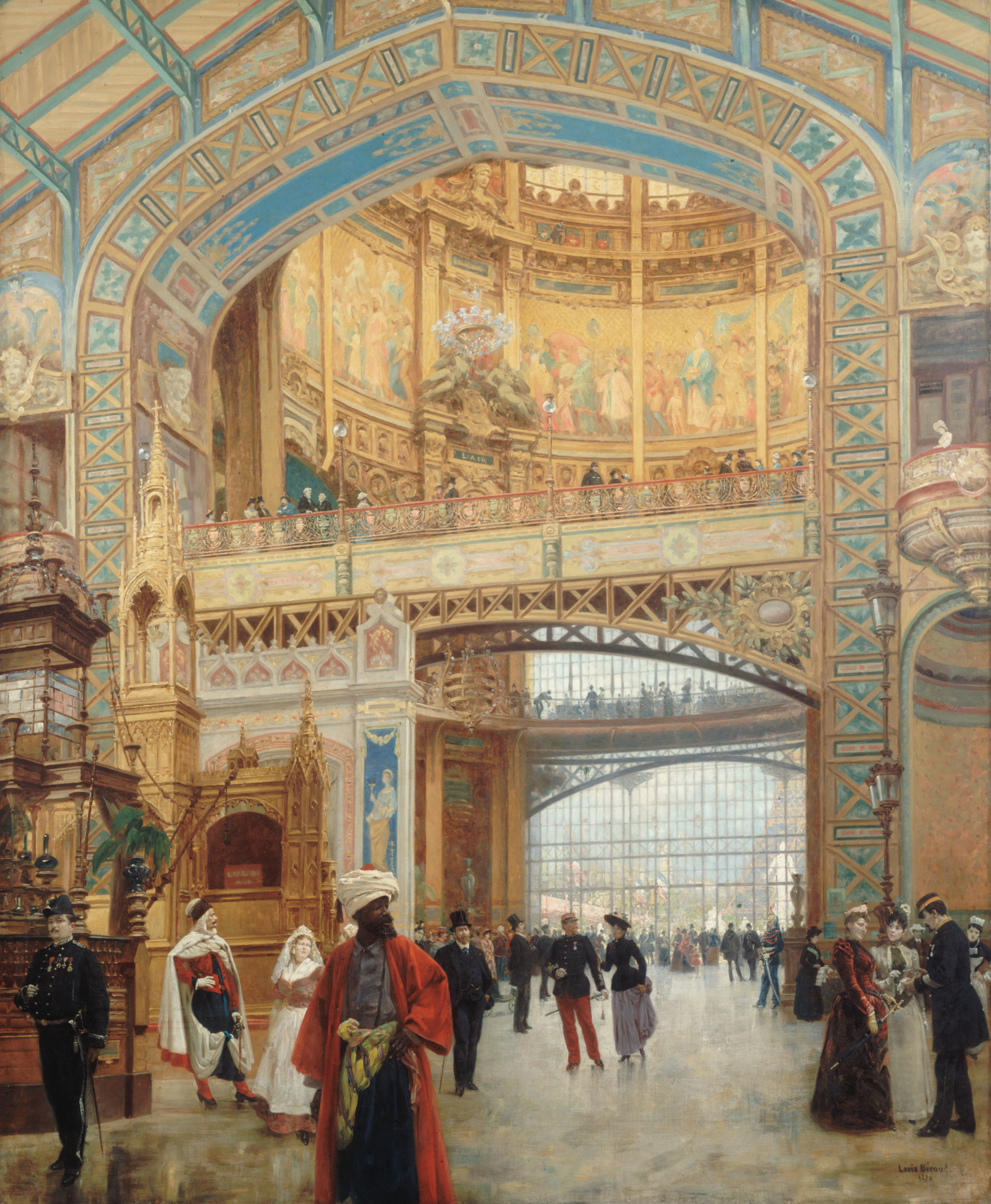
Central Dome of the Galerie des Machines, 1889 Exposition Universelle de Paris, 1889, by Louis Béroud (1852-1930).

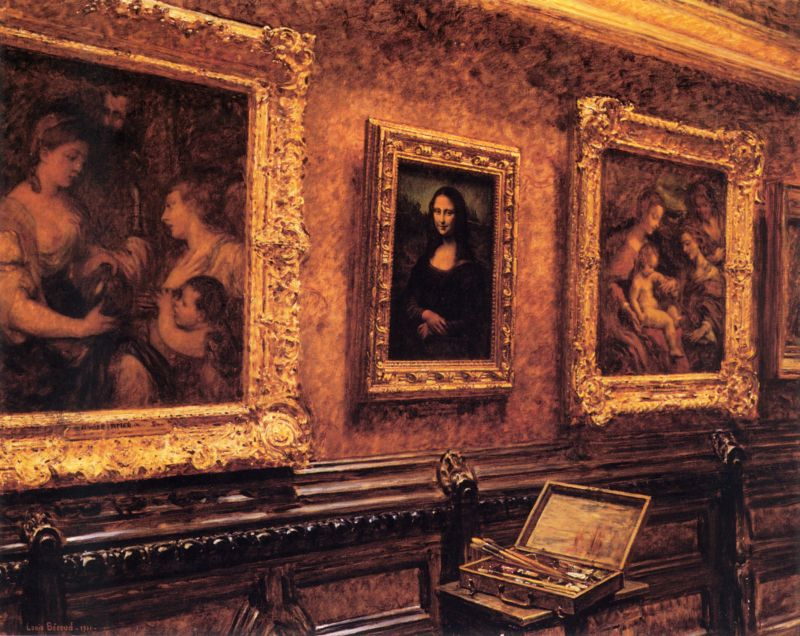
Béroud's 1911 painting depicting Mona Lisa in the Louvre

Louis Béroud (17 January 1852, Lyon – 9 October 1930, Paris) was a French painter of the late 19th and early 20th century. Some of his paintings are visible at the Musée Carnavalet and The Louvre in Paris. On 22 August 1911, Béroud came to The Louvre to sketch his painting Mona Lisa au Louvre but where the famous La Joconde, by Leonardo da Vinci, should have stood, he found four iron pegs. Béroud contacted the section head of the guards, who thought the painting was being photographed for marketing purposes. A few hours later, Béroud checked back with the section head of the museum, and it was confirmed that the Mona Lisa was not with the photographers. The Louvre was closed for an entire week to aid in investigation of the theft.

== Works ==
List of some of his works in French national museums:

- L'escalier de l'opéra Garnier (1877), Carnavalet Museum
- Le dôme central de la galerie des machines à l'exposition universelle de 1889 (1890), Carnavalet Museum
- Salle Rubens au Louvre (1904), Musée du Louvre
- À la gloire de Rubens (1905), Musée du Louvre
- Au Salon Carré du Louvre (1906), Musée du Louvre
- Chambre du Baron Basile de Schlichting (1908), Musée du Louvre
- Vue de la Salle des Sept Cheminées au Louvre (1909), Musée du Louvre
- L'Avenue de la Gare à Nice, Musée Masséna
