= Mona Lisa (Prado) =

Copy of the Mona Lisa in Prado, Madrid

Prado Mona Lisa
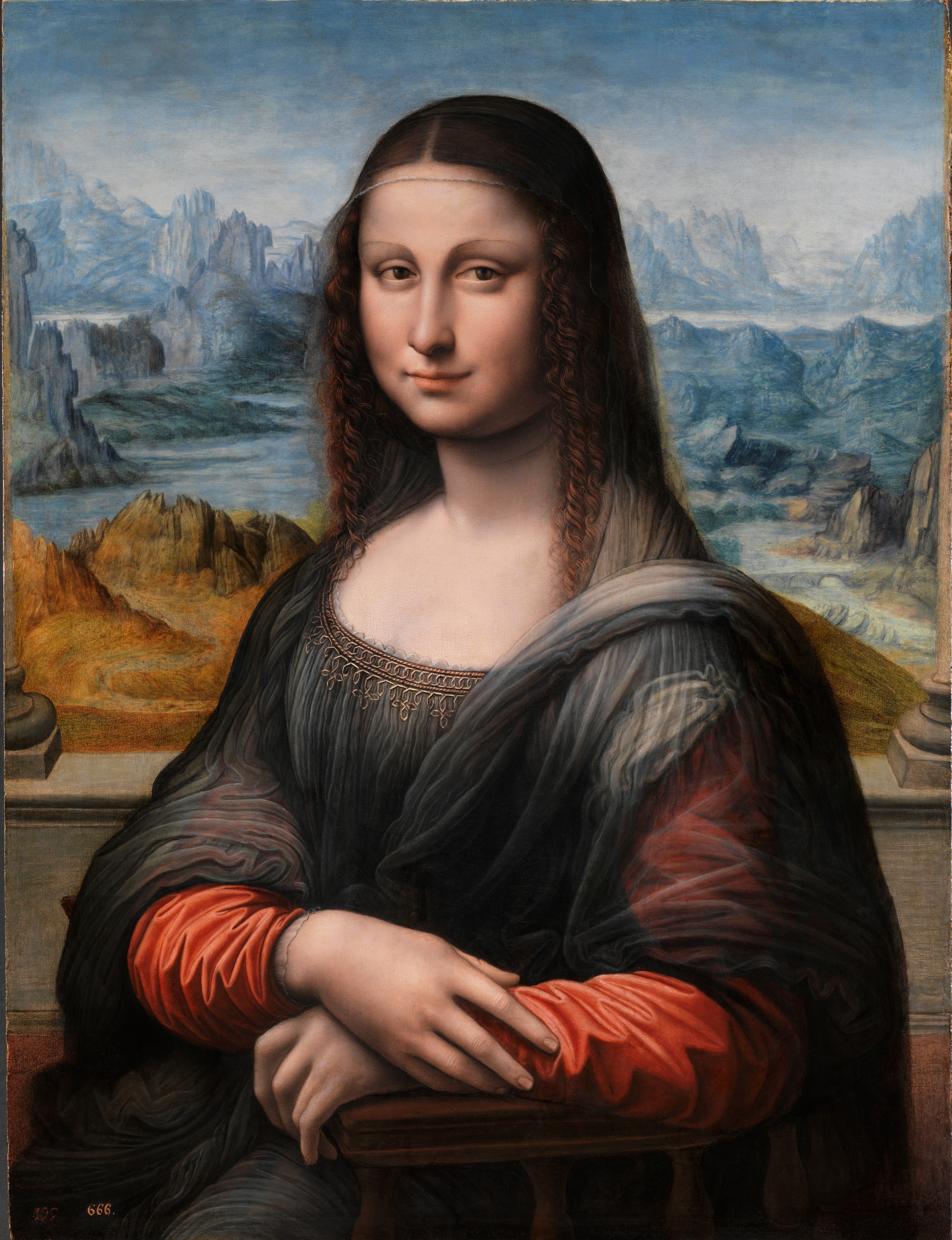
- Artist: Workshop of Leonardo da Vinci
- Year: c. 1503–1516
- Medium: Oil on walnut panel
- Subject: Lisa Gherardini
- Dimensions: 76.3 cm × 57 cm (30.0 in × 22 in)
- Location: Museo del Prado, Madrid

The Prado Mona Lisa is a painting by the workshop of Leonardo da Vinci and depicts the same subject and composition as Leonardo's better known Mona Lisa at the Louvre, Paris. The Prado Mona Lisa has been in the collection of the Museo del Prado in Madrid, Spain since 1819, but was considered for decades a relatively unimportant copy. Following its restoration in 2012, however, the Prado's Mona Lisa has come to be understood as the earliest known studio copy of Leonardo's masterpiece.

The original Mona Lisa, by Leonardo da Vinci, Louvre

Although there are dozens of surviving copies of the Mona Lisa from the 16th and 17th centuries, the Prado's Mona Lisa may have been painted simultaneously by a student of Leonardo in the same studio where he painted his own Mona Lisa, so it is said to be the copy with the most historical value. Among the pupils of Leonardo, Salaì or Francesco Melzi are the most plausible authors of the Prado's version, though other experts argue that the painting could have been executed by one of Leonardo's Spanish students.

== Background ==
The origins of the Prado's Mona Lisa are linked to those of Leonardo's original, as both paintings were likely created simultaneously in the same studio. The first documentary reference was made in the 1666 inventory in the Galleria del Mediodia of the Alcazar in Madrid as Mujer de mano de Leonardo Abince (Woman by Leonardo da Vinci's hand). However, it is still unknown when the portrait entered the Spanish Royal Collection, though it could have been already in Spain in the early years of the 17th century. Since the Prado's founding in 1819, the copy has been part of its permanent collection.

== Restoration ==
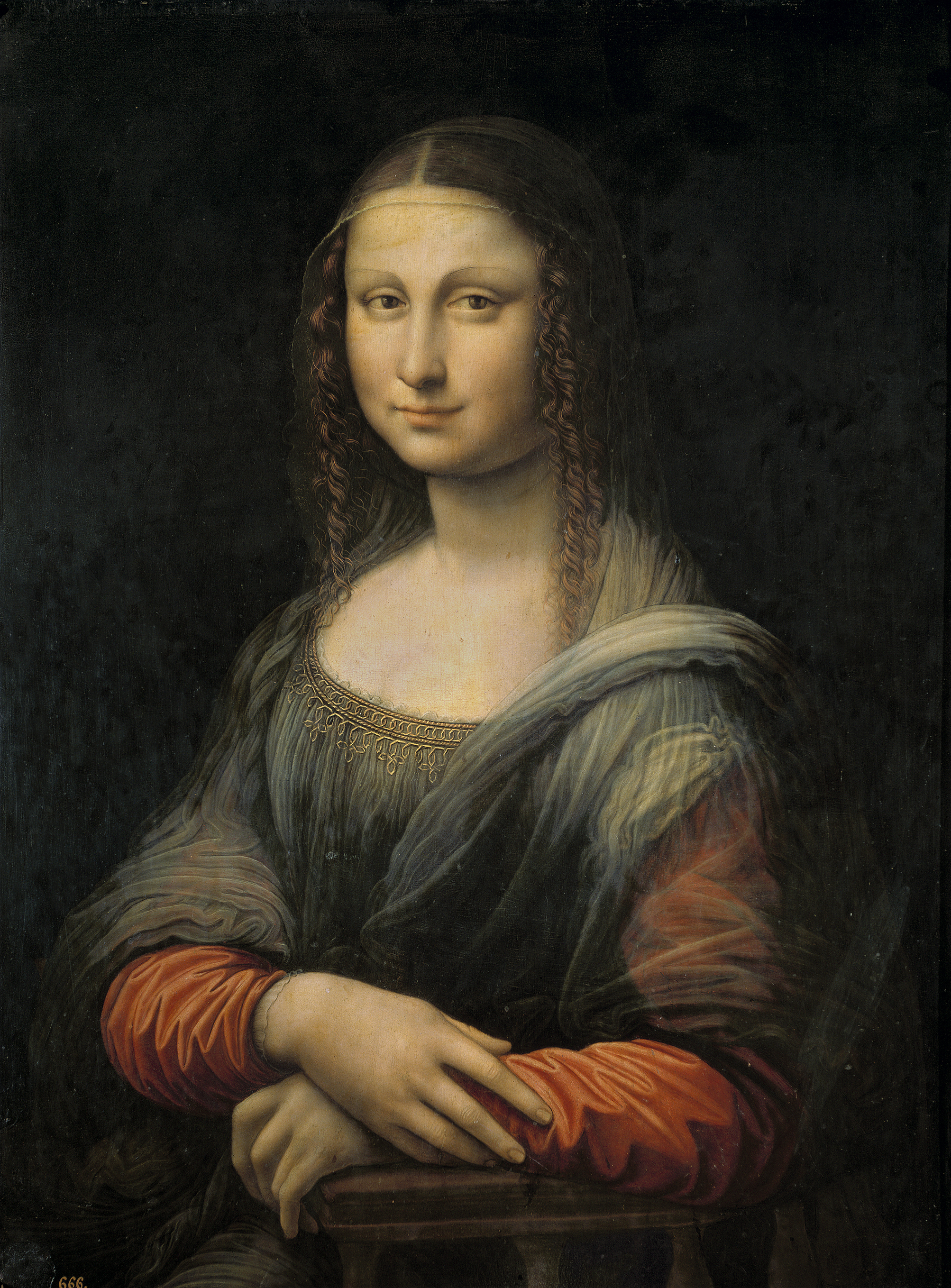
The Prado's Mona Lisa before its restoration, with the black repaint of the landscape background.

Previous to its restoration, the painting was catalogued as an anonymous copy from the first quarter of the 16th century. However, it usually hung in the Prado alongside masterpieces of Italian artists such as Raphael or Andrea del Sarto. A lithograph of the painting also exists, which is unusual for an anonymous copy.

Although there were elements that clearly distinguished the copy from the Louvre's version, the most striking point was that until the restoration of the Prado's version, no landscape background was visible. That landscape was fully recovered through the restoration carried out by the Prado between 2011 and 2012, for a request to include the Prado's work in a temporary exhibition in the Louvre called Leonardo's last masterpiece: The Sainte Anne, from 29 March to 25 June 2012. The oxidized varnishes indicated that the black repaint had been made 200 years after the copy was painted, that is to say, not before 1750.

During this restoration process, the copy was also submitted to a study of infrared reflectography and radiography, where the results revealed that the painting had been made in the workshop of Leonardo da Vinci at the same time the original Mona Lisa was painted. The "key" of this discovery was the underlying drawing, as it is the same but with different style in both paintings, as well as the drawing's corrections.

These findings, coupled with the excellent state of preservation in regard to the Louvre's version, show the original colours of the Prado's painting and indicates what the copy must have originally looked like, as the varnish on the original has become cracked and yellowed with age. It is anticipated that such revelations also may offer further insight into Leonardo's original.

The suggestion that the Prado version was painted in the workshop of Leonardo at the same time as the Louvre version, presumably by an apprentice, is supported by the observation that it appears to have been rendered from a slightly different perspective than the original. This has fuelled speculation that the pair may constitute the world’s first stereoscopic image, and hence when viewed dichoptically (i.e. with the Prado version viewed by the left eye, and the Louvre version by the right) may produce a distinct 3D appearance. This possibility is plausible, given the fact that Leonardo discussed the rudiments of stereoscopic vision in his Trattato della pittura. However, a more recent report has demonstrated that this pair in fact gives no reliable stereoscopic depth.

== Attribution ==
Before the restoration, the Prado's copy was sometimes attributed to a painter of the Flemish school. This conclusion was based on the long-held belief that the copy's wooden frame was thought to be oak and due to its repainting. However, during the 2010 restoration, conservators realized the frame's material is walnut, an expensive wood frequently used in works of Leonardo, such as Lady with an Ermine, La Belle Ferronnière or Saint John the Baptist.

After the restoration, it was suggested that two of Leonardo's pupils, Francesco Melzi or Salaì, were among the probable painters, though others questioned this assumption; they suggest the author could have been a Spanish student of Leonardo, namely Fernando Yáñez de la Almedina or Hernando de los Llanos. The painting cannot be considered as a typical workshop copy due to its careful and thorough execution, as well as its use of materials such as lapis lazuli or red lacquer.

Ana Gonzáles Mozo, curator at the Prado Museum in Madrid, wrote in the catalog for the exhibition Leonardo and the Copy of the Mona Lisa that the so-called Ganay copy of the Salvador Mundi was likely done by the same artist that painted the Prado Mona Lisa.
