= USS Maine =

Four ships of the United States Navy have borne the name USS Maine, named for the 23rd state:

- USS Maine (ACR-1), was a battleship whose 1898 sinking precipitated the Spanish–American War.
- USS Maine (BB-10), launched in 1901, was the lead ship of her class of battleships. She participated in the voyage of the Great White Fleet, and was decommissioned in 1920 to be sold for scrap in 1923.
- USS Maine (BB-69) was to be a Montana-class battleship, and was cancelled in 1943.
- USS Maine (SSBN-741), launched in 1994, is an Ohio-class nuclear ballistic missile submarine, in active service as of 2026.

== See also ==
- SS Maine, a British steamship launched in 1905
