= Turbary =

Historical right to harvest fuel from bogs

Turbary is the ancient right to cut turf, or peat, for fuel on a particular area of bog. The word may also be used to describe the associated piece of bog or peatland and, by extension, the material extracted from the turbary. Turbary rights, which are more fully expressed legally as common of turbary, are often associated with commonage, or, in some cases, rights over another person's land.

Turbary was not always an unpaid right (easement), but, at least in Ireland, regulations governed the price that could be charged.

Turf was widely used as fuel for cooking and domestic heating but also for commercial purposes such as evaporating brine to produce salt. The right to take peat was particularly important in areas where firewood was scarce. The right to collect firewood was protected by estovers.

In the New Forest of southern England, a particular right of turbary belongs not to an individual person, dwelling or plot of land, but to a particular hearth and chimney.

== Ecology ==
In more recent times, as the ecological significance of the bog lands has been better understood, and as the amount of remaining peat has been decreasing, partly due to fuel usage and partly due to usage of peat as fertiliser, as well as agricultural incursions into drained bog lands, some of the remaining bogs have come under environmental protection. This has created controversy over the rights of turbary, and in some cases extinguished the right.

== Geography ==
Geographic regions of turbary works in Europe include the Netherlands, Ireland, Scotland and Wales, and The Broads in Norfolk and Suffolk, England, and the Audomarois marshlands near Saint-Omer, France The term is also used in colloquial language by older generations in Ireland, in places such as County Clare, to refer to the area where turf is cut, or to the material extracted.

== Etymology ==
The word is derived from Anglo-French turberie and Low German, turf. Compare Sanskrit दर्भ (dharbá), meaning "tuft of grass".

== Places ==
Turbary Park in Bournemouth, Dorset has a name derived from the term.
