= Léon Roger-Milès =

French lawyer, writer (1859–1928)

Léon Roger (also known as Léon Roger-Milès or just Roger-Milès; 3 November 1859 – 24 May 1928) was a French lawyer, historian, poet, journalist and art critic.

== Biography ==
Born in Paris, Roger-Milès was a professor at the Collège-lycée Jacques-Decour from 1879 to 1887. From 1887 to 1899, he was an advocate in the cour d'appel.

From 1878, he also directed Le Parnasse and founded the review Le Monde poétique (1884–1888), of which he was also the director. As a journalist, he wrote for Le Figaro illustré, L'Eclair, Le Temps, Le Courrier français, le Soir, le Gaulois, L'Evènement, Efimeris ton Athinon, Le Journal du grand monde, La Semaine de Paris, La Revue des Deux Mondes, and Le Cousin Pons (revue d'art).

His book Les Heures d'une Parisienne (1890) includes the titular short novel together with Pures et Impures, a collection of twenty-one stories. The story "Une Vision d'Allori" is dedicated to the painter Gabriel Guay, who provided the book's cover art.

In his 1923 book, Leonard de Vinci et les Jocondes, Roger-Milès argues that Leonardo actually painted at least two versions of the Mona Lisa, including one done for Francesco del Giocondo, and another for Giuliano de' Medici.

== Death ==
He died in Golfe-Juan.

== Distinctions ==
- Chevalier de la Légion d'honneur (16 August 1900)
