= Lycée Turgot =

Lycée polyvalent de Turgot
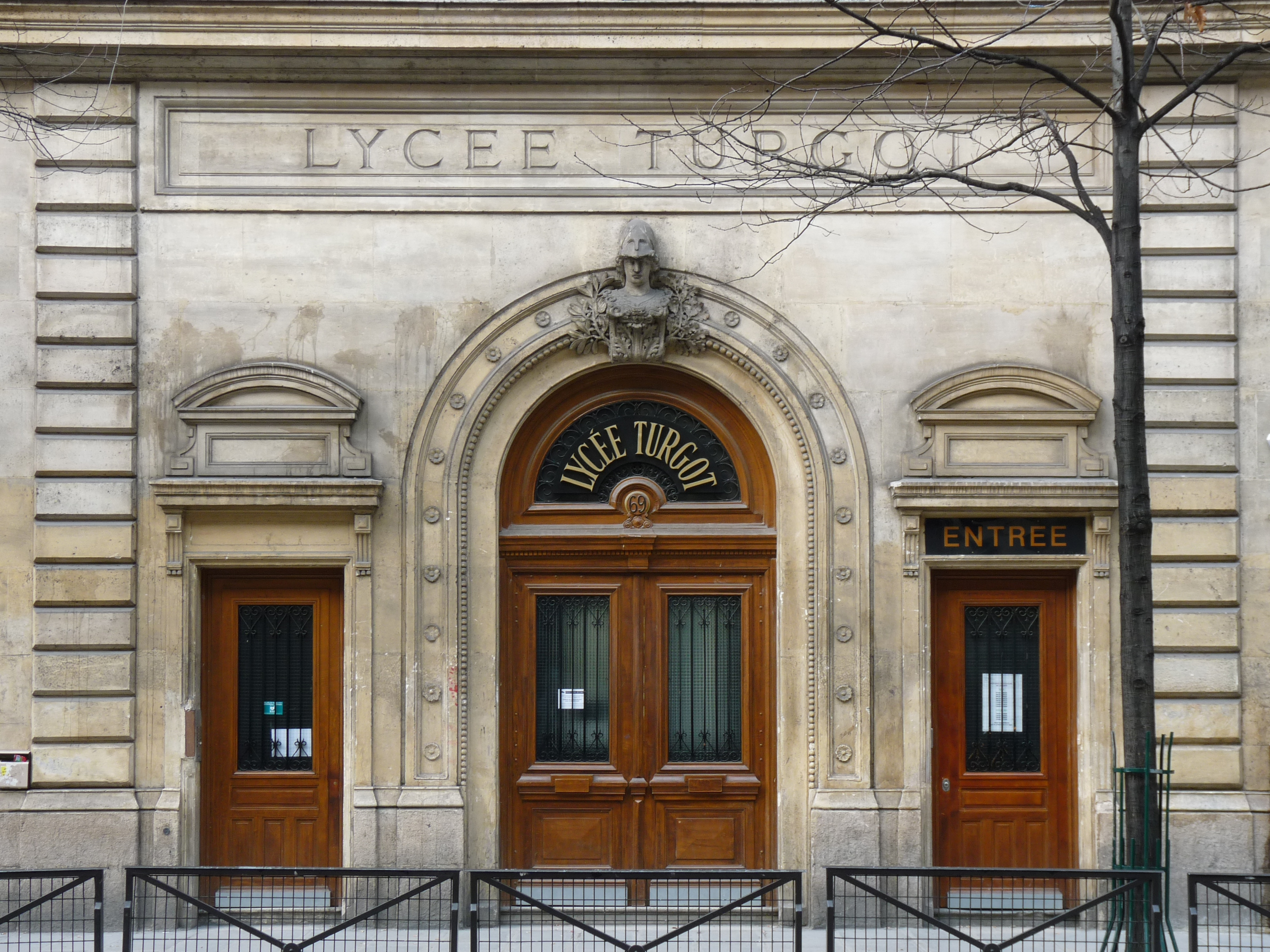

Location
- 69 rue de Turbigo, Paris; France
- 48.866239°N 2.358477°E

Information
- Type: Établissement public local d'enseignement (EPLE)
- Principal: Christophe Barrand
- Enrollment: 1306 students in 2009
- Website: http://lyc-turgot.ac-paris.fr

The lycée polyvalent de Turgot is a lycée located in the 3rd arrondissement of Paris. Its entrance is located at 69 rue de Turbigo. It runs classe préparatoire aux grandes écoles in the D1, D2, PC and ECT streams.

The lycée was built on the former site of the Madelonnettes Convent, which was demolished by the construction of the rue de Turbigo, between 1865 and 1866. It is served by the métro stations Arts et Métiers and Temple.

== History ==
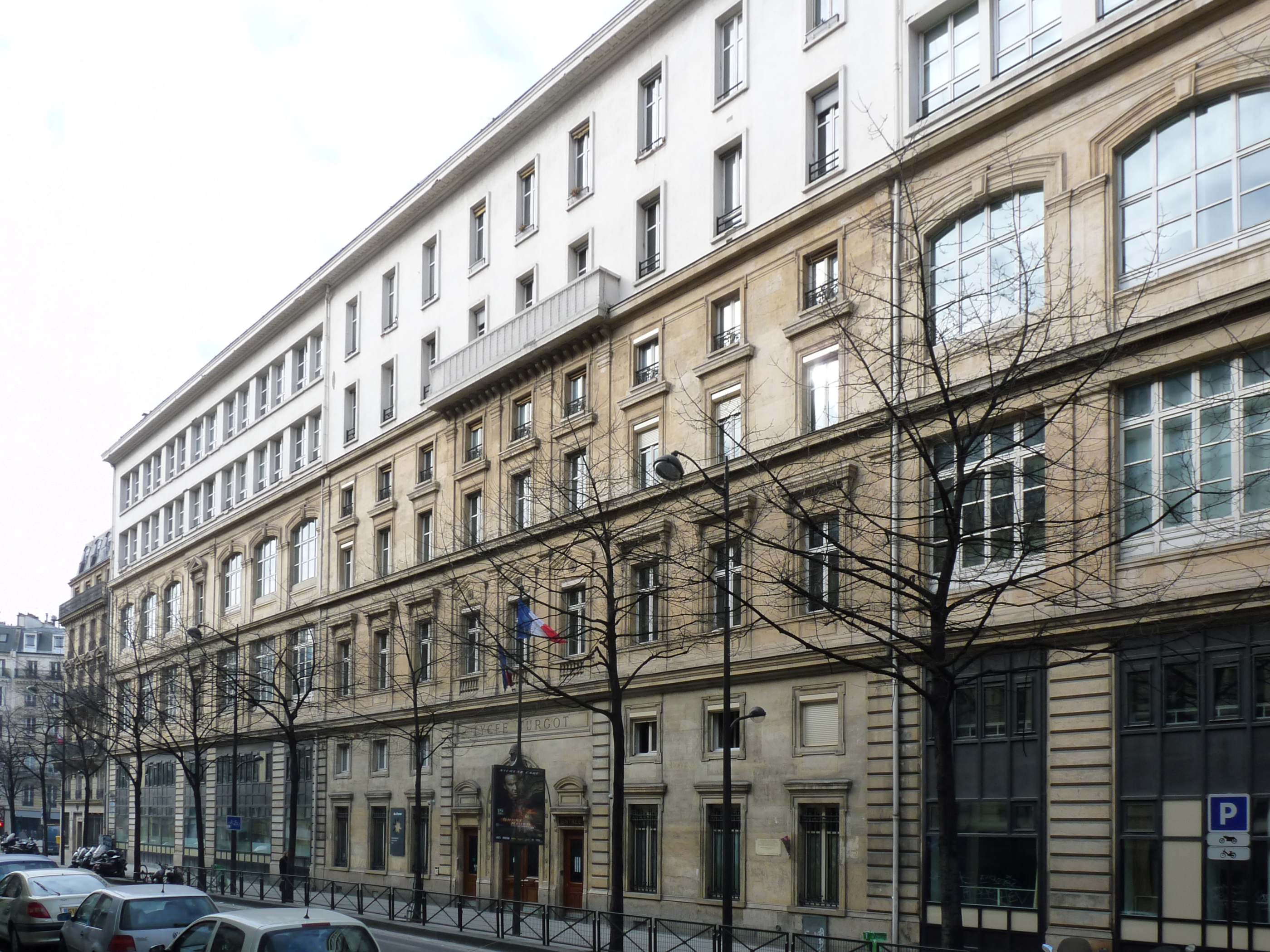
Façade on rue de Turbigo.

It was formerly known as the "Higher Primary School of rue Turbigo".

== Ranking of the lycée ==
In 2016, the lycée was ranked 13th out of 109 at departmental level in terms of teaching quality, and 43rd at national level. The ranking is based on three criteria: The bac results, the proportion of students who obtain their baccalauréat who studied at the establishment for their last two years, and the value added (calculated based on the social background of the students, their age, and their national diploma results).

== CPGE rankings ==
The national rankings of preparatory classes for the major schools (CPGE) look at the number of students admitted to the grandes écoles.

In 2015, L'Étudiant gave the following rankings for 2014 :

Course	Students admitted to a grande école^{*}	Admission rate^{*}	Average rate over 5 years	National ranking	Progress year on year
PC / PC*	1 / 27 students	3.27%	0.6%	45 out of 110	=
Source : Classement 2019 des prépas - L'Étudiant (Concours de 2018). * the admission rate depends upon the grandes écoles included in the study. For example, in ECE and ECS, these areHEC, ESSEC, and ESCP; in khâgne, these are ENSAE, ENC, the 3 ENS, and 5 business schools.

== Former students ==
- Claude Bartolone (1951-), politician.
- Robert Desnos (1900-1945), French poet.
- Paul Dukas (1865-1935), French composer.
- Honoré Champion (1846-1913), French editor.
- Yves Gomy (1942-), French entomologist (coleopterist).
- Richard Khaitzine (1947-), French writer.
- Henri Lagriffoul (1907-1981), French sculptor laureate and grand Prix de Rome 1932 and sculptor of the reverse of the 1962 Franc centimes.
- André Malraux (1901-1976), French writer, adventurer and politician.
- Claude Miller (1942-2012), French cineast.
- Alain Minc (1949-), French essayist, economist and politician.
- Robi Morder (1954-), employment lawyer and policy maker, specialist in student movements.
- André-Louis Perinetti (1933-), French theatre director.
- Jean-Jacques Romero (1945-) trade unionist.
- Jean Sarkozy (1986-), French politician.
- Pierre Rondeau (1987-), French economist.

== Notable professors ==
- Emmanuel Beau de Loménie, historian
- Marc Bousseyrol, economist, writer
- Pierre Boutang (1916-1998), French philosopher, political journalist and translator
- Pierre Goubert (1915-2012), historian
- Gabriel Guay (1848-1923), artist and painter
