= Musée des Beaux-Arts de Morlaix =

Coordinates: 48.5768°N 3.8248°W

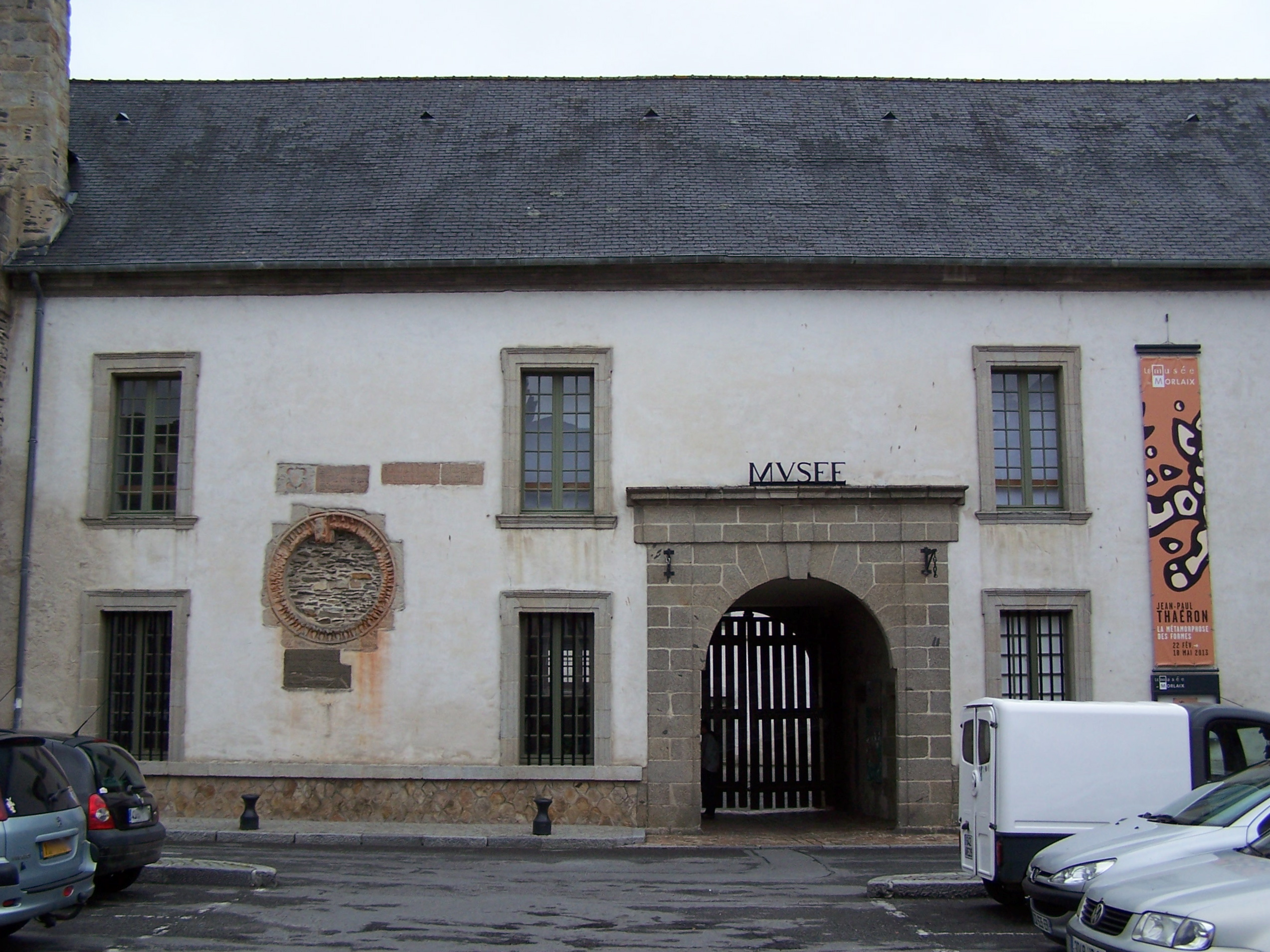
- Established: 1889
- Location: Couvent des Jacobins, Morlaix, France
- Visitors: 24,366 (2002)

The Musée des Beaux-Arts de Morlaix is a museum of fine arts in Morlaix, Brittany, France. It is also known as the Musée des Jacobins, since it opened in a former Jacobin convent (confiscated after the French Revolution) in 1889.

== Collections ==
Its main works include Venus and Adonis by Giovanni Francesco Romanelli, The Martyrdom of Saint Bartholomew by Sébastien Bourdon and The Death of Hector by Joseph-Marie Vien. 19th-century art is represented by Portrait of Madame Andler by Gustave Courbet, The Pardon of Méros by Théophile Deyrolle, The Chemin de Bas-fort-Blanc by Élodie La Villette, A Grain by Eugène Boudin and Rain at Belle-île by Claude Monet.

On his death in 1920, the painter Louis-Marie Baader left over 70 works to the museum. In 1927 it acquired 19 paintings and 4 drawings by the Australian artist John Peter Russell, who had lived in Belle-Île-en-Mer. In 1999 it acquired the decorative features designed by Maurice Denis for his house of Perros-Guirec and an oil painting of 1906 by Armand Berton, Toilette after Bathing.

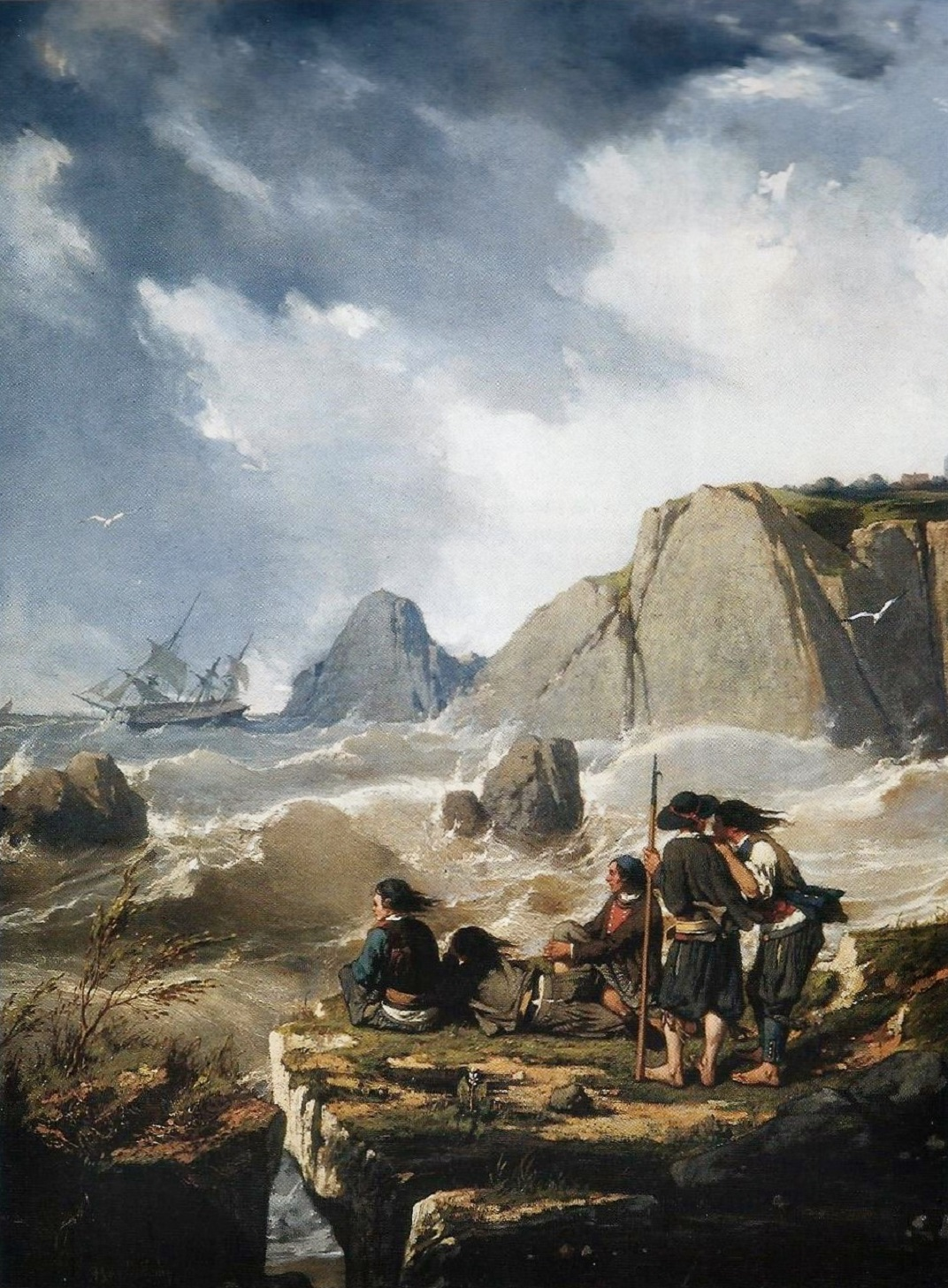
Pierre-Émile Barthélémy: Shipwreck on the Coast of Brittany (1851)

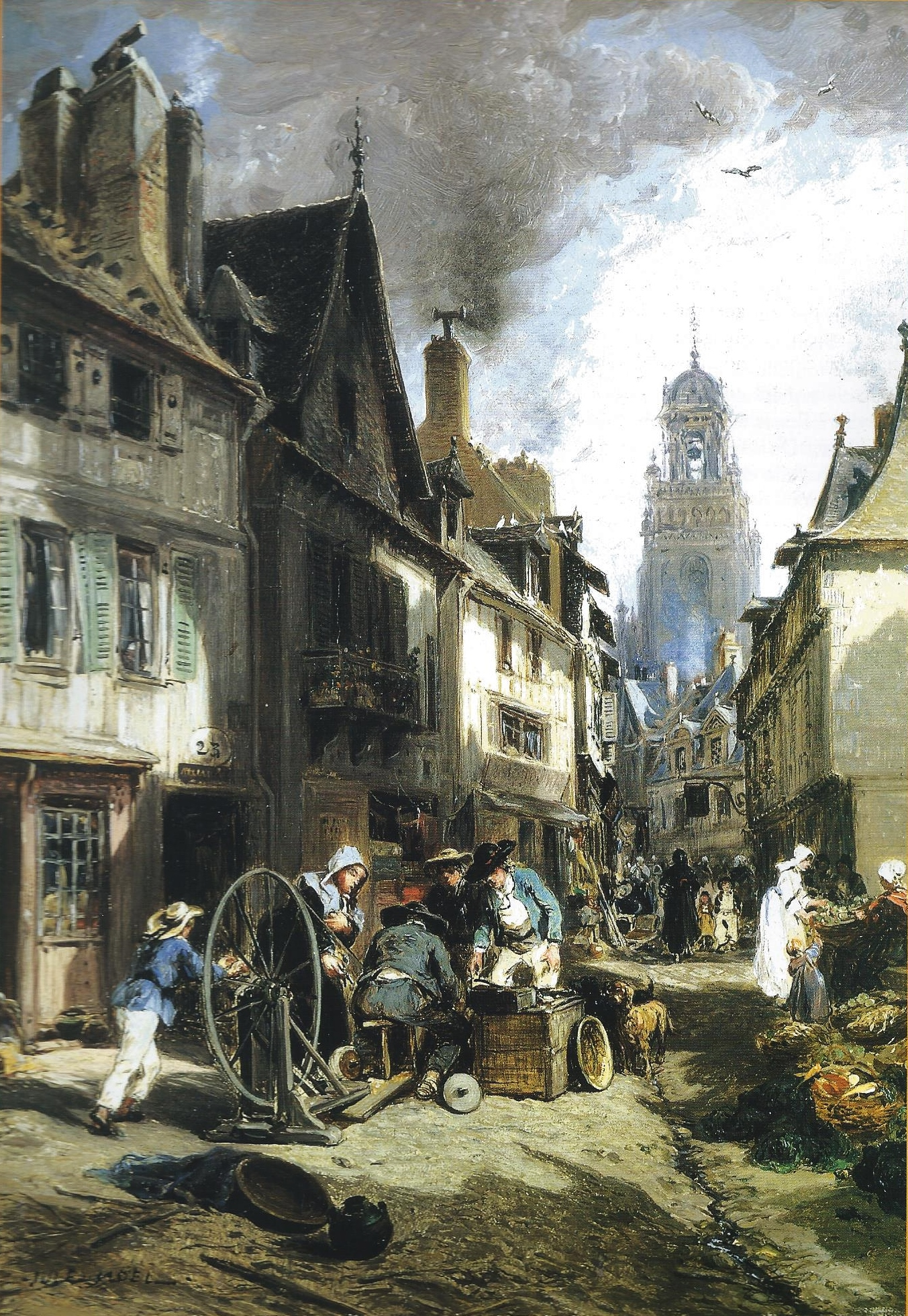
Jules Noël: The Knife Grinder in Morlaix (c. 1869)

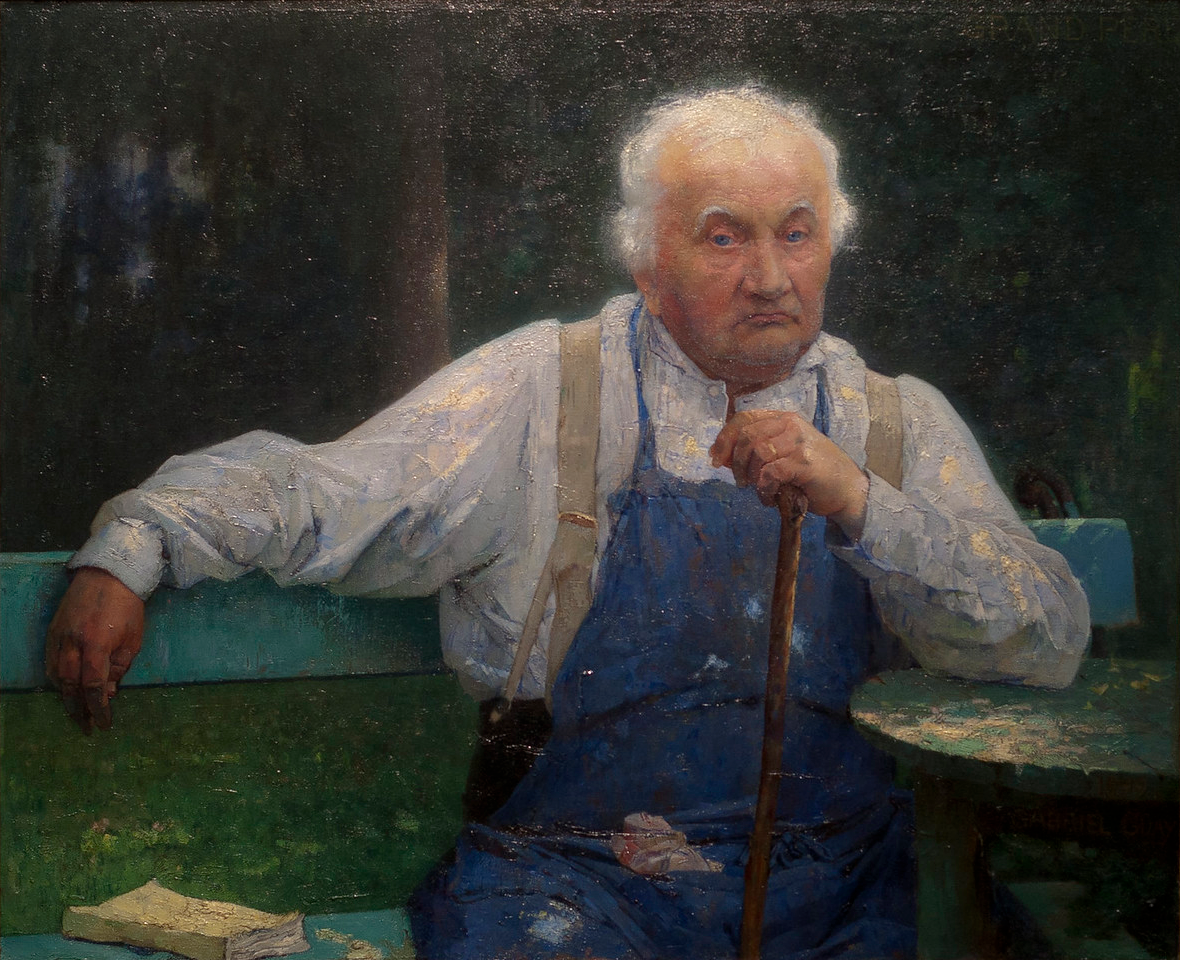
Gabriel Guay: Un viellard dans un jardin (by 1899)
