= Marais Audomarois =

Coordinates: 50°47′07″N 02°13′56″E

Designations

Ramsar Wetland
- Official name: Le Marais audomarois
- Designated: 15 September 2008
- Reference no.: 1835

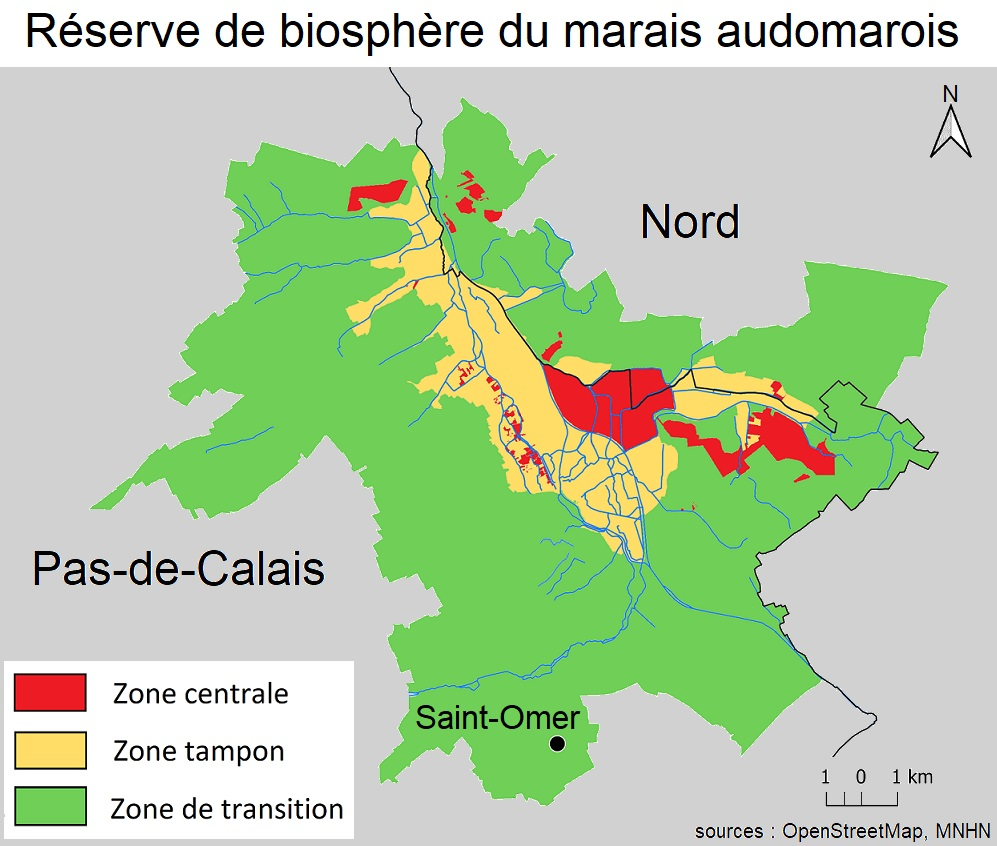
Location in Pas-de-Calais and Nord

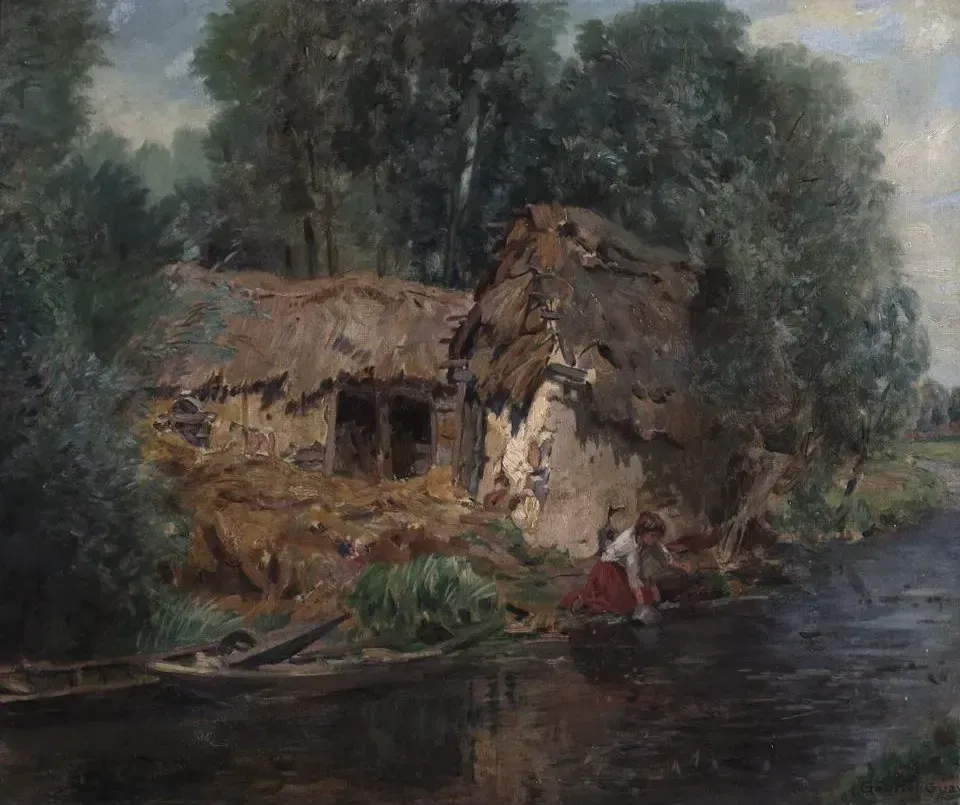
Gabriel Guay, Young Girl Gathering Water at Saint-Omer, c. 1895

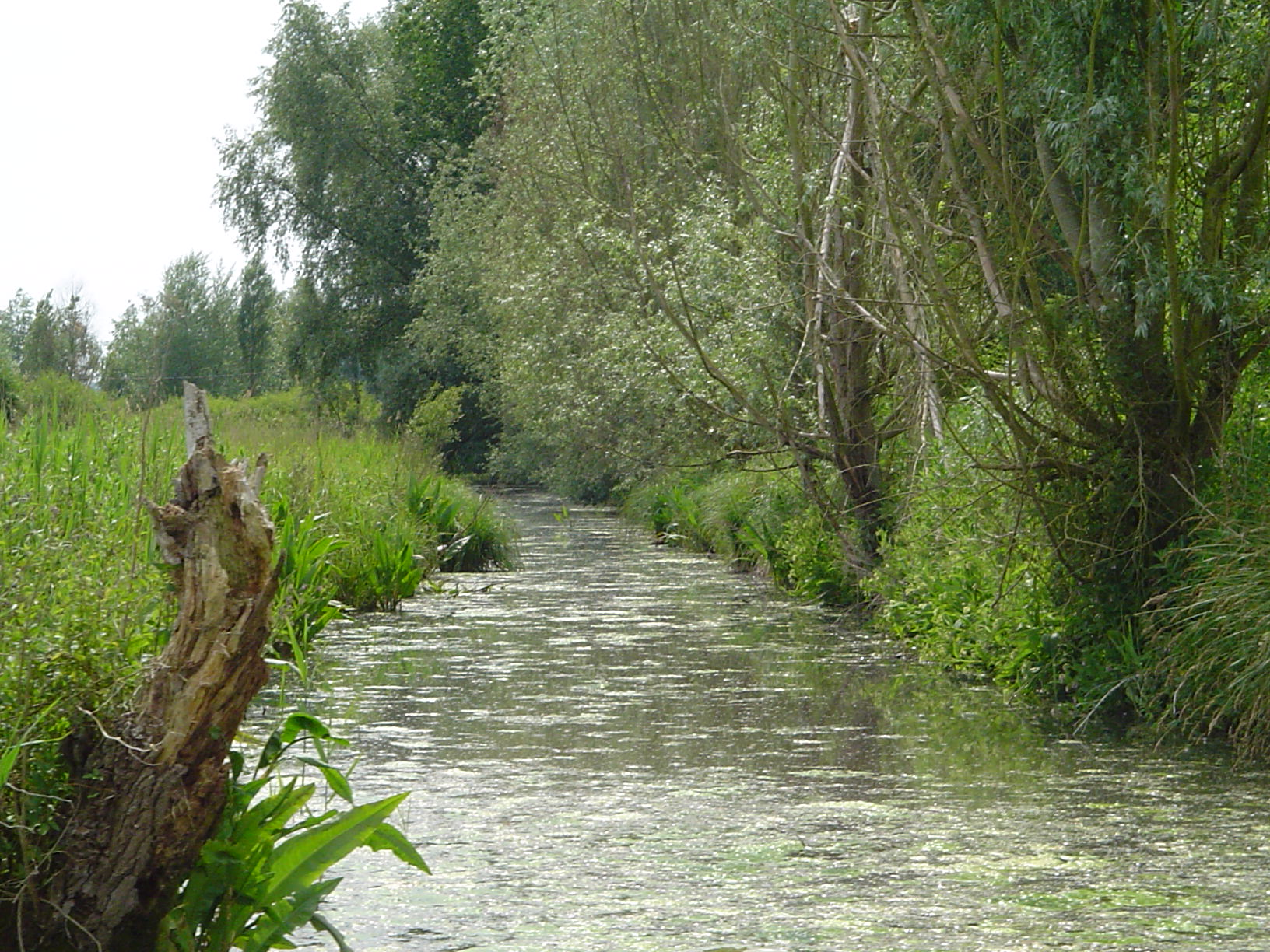
Waterway in the marshland

The Marais Audomarois (French pronunciation: [maʁɛ odɔmaʁwa]) is a wetland biosphere reserve in the north of France. The renowned Ramsar site covers some 22 300 hectares, including the city of Saint-Omer.

== Geography ==
The Audomarois landscape owes its richness to its particular geography. It is located at an intersection between three natural regions: the coastal plain, the Flanders intérieure and the Artois hills.

These multifaceted landscapes are host to a wide variety of flora and fauna. The main natural habitats are reedbeds, tall herbs, peaty woods, meadows, ditches and rivers. The many species of flora include aquatic vegetation such as flowering rush (Butomus umbellatus), greater spearwort (Ranunculus lingua) and marsh fern (Thelypteris palustris), as well as underwater and floating vegetation. These habitat types enable many species of birds to breed, feed and rest.

There are also a number of endangered species in the region, including cowbane (Cicuta virosa), river water-dropwort (Oenanthe fluviatilis) and water soldier (Stratiotes aloides).

The natural heritage of the reserve is especially remarkable for the abundance and variety of its waterbird communities. Located on major migration routes, the Audomarois marsh provides food and necessary rest for birds such as sedge warblers (Acrocephalus schoenobaenus), the bluethroat (Luscinia svecica), the warbler effarvate (Acrocephalus scirpaceus) and the rare aquatic warbler (Acrocephalus paludicola).

In view of this natural wealth (flora, fauna and landscapes), the Audomarois marsh enjoys several forms of protected status, including inscription as a Natura 2000 Site, a National Nature Reserve, a Regional Natural Reserve and a Regional Natural Park. Since 2008, the wetland has also been recognized as a place of international importance under the Ramsar Convention.

== Socioeconomic characteristics ==
The reserve has a permanent population of 69 000 residents, as well as one of France’s two remaining wetland floating gardens, the other being the hortillonnages in Amiens. Since the seventeenth century, market gardening activities have promoted the development and creation of these landscapes, which are still preserved today. The gardens are characterized by a system of wateringues (water management units or small canals) crucial for the prevention and management of floods. The reserve is also a highly valued site for leisure and tourism.

== Gallery ==
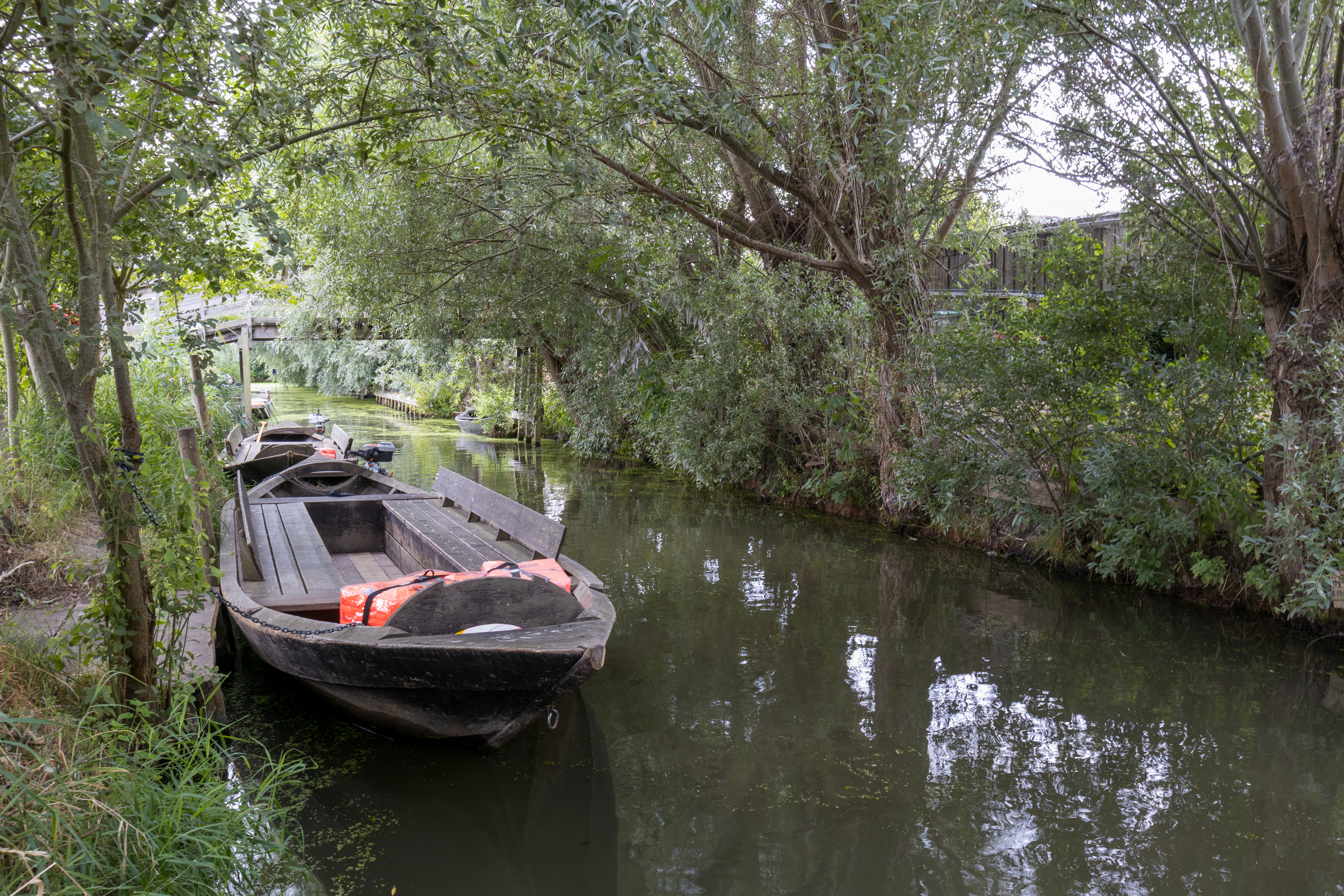
A bacôve, a large traditional flat-bottomed wooden boat from the Audomarois swamp.

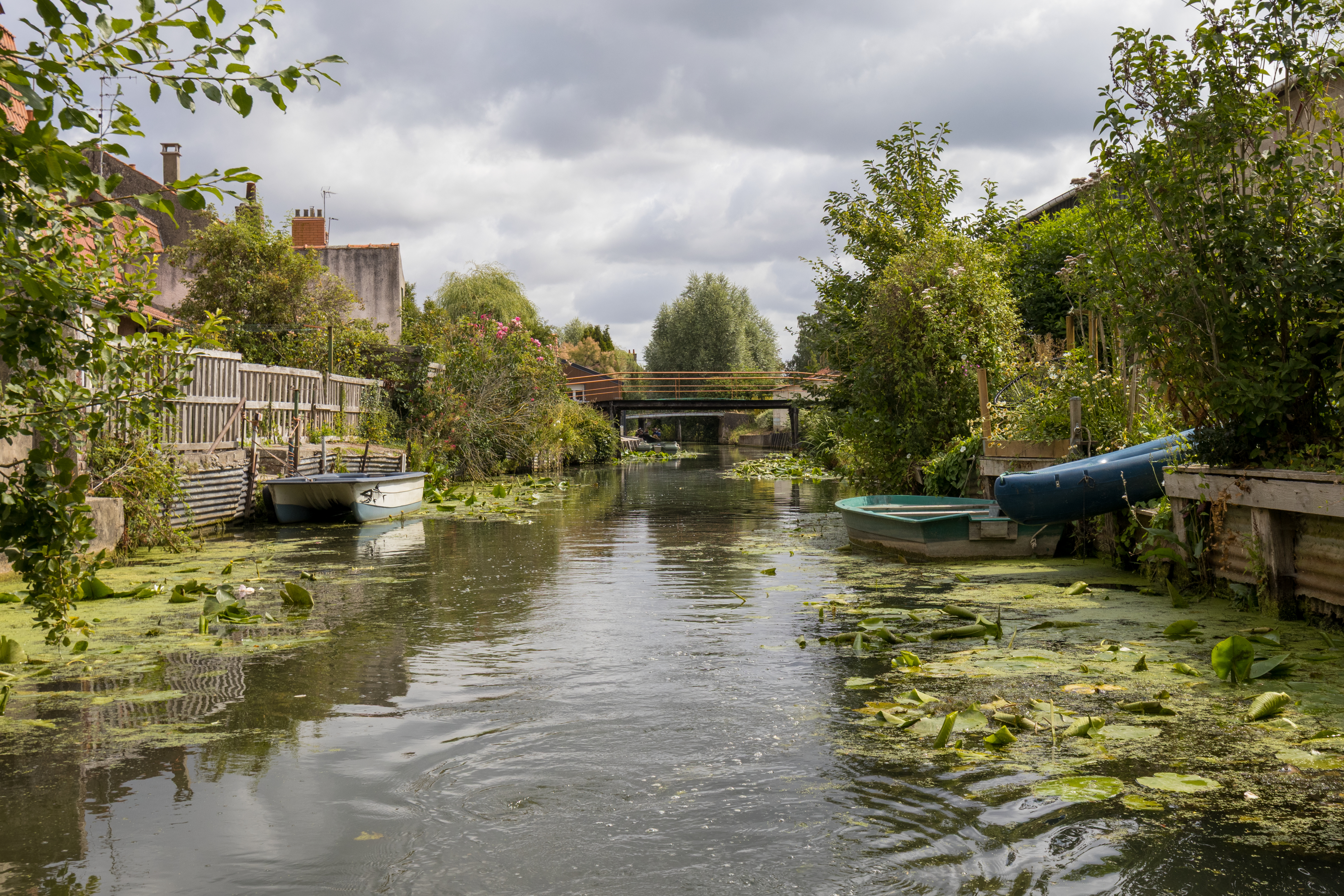
Fauna and flora that can be discovered during an outing in bacôve.

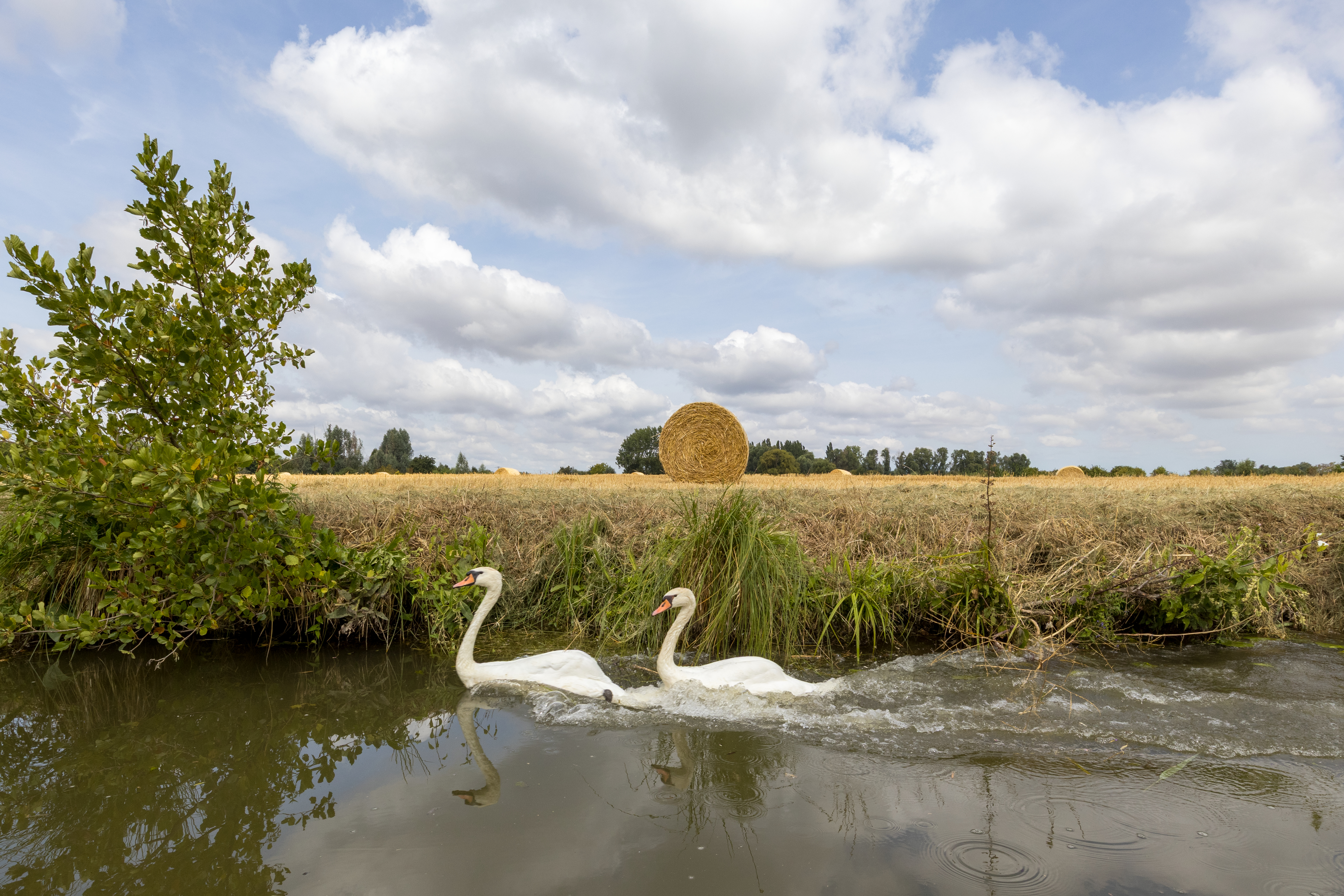
Swans

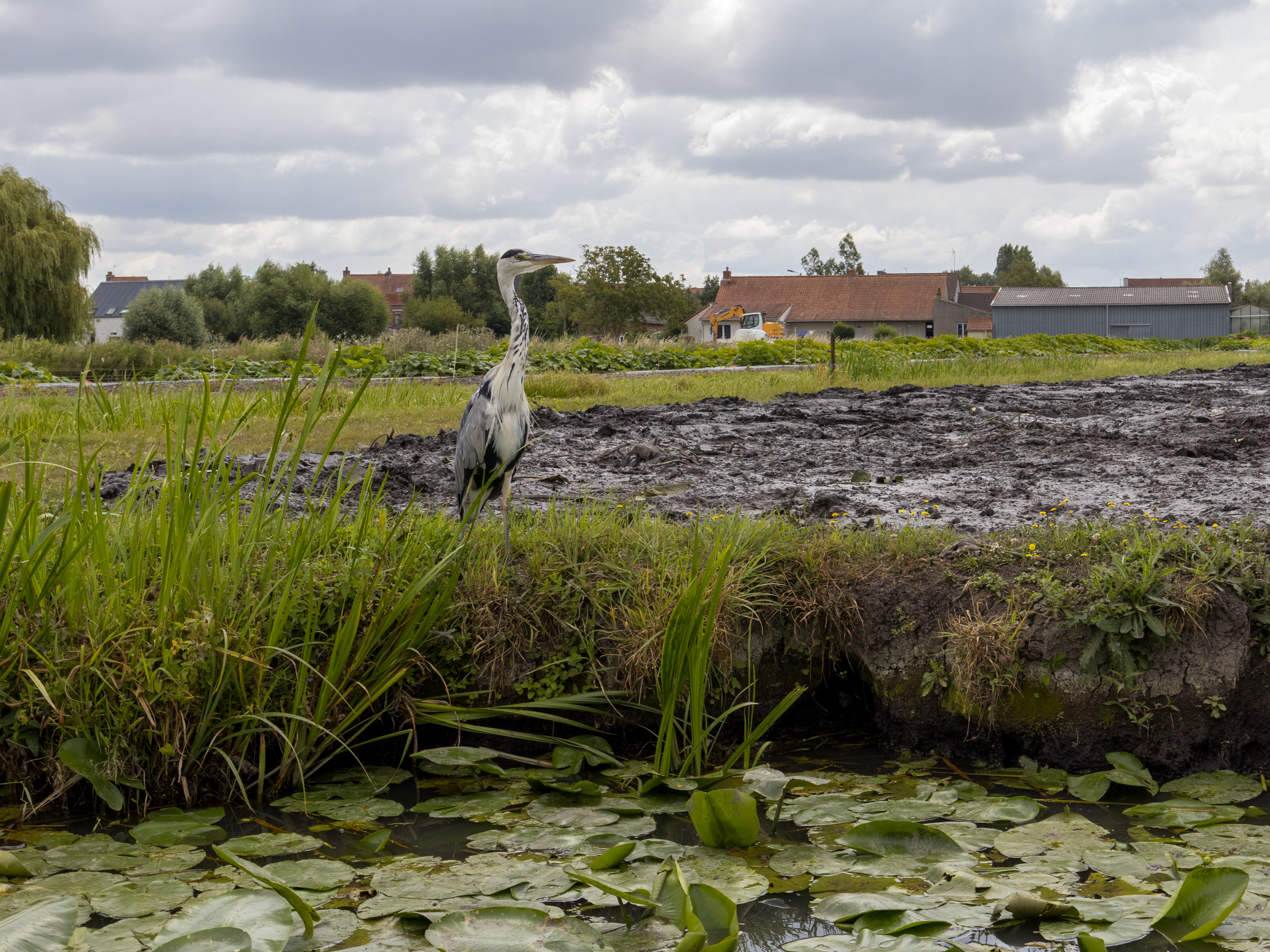
A heron

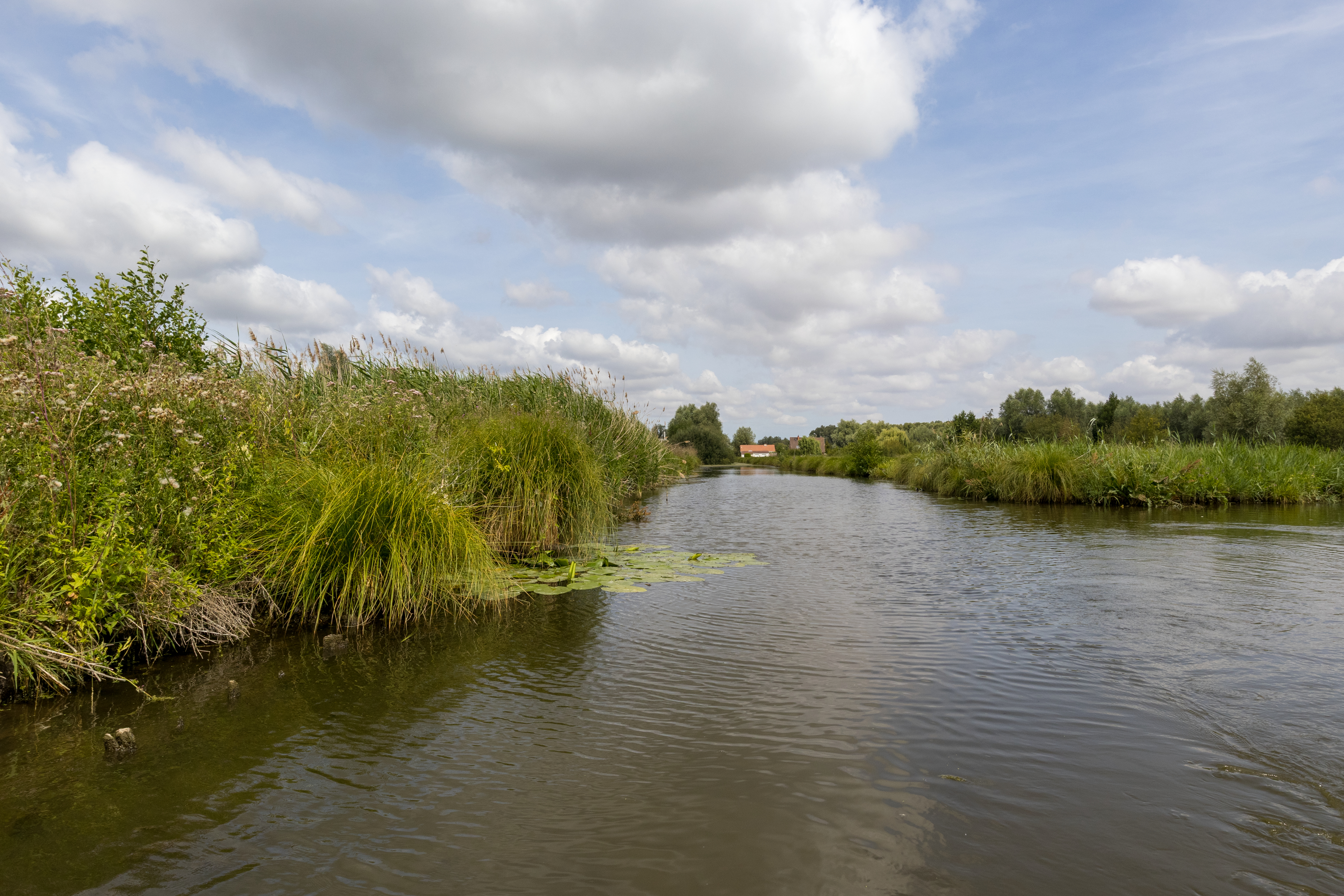

== Sources ==
This article incorporates text from a free content work (license statement/permission). Text taken from UNESCO - MAB Biosphere Reserves Directory, UNESCO, UNESCO.
