= Henry F. Pulitzer =

Austrian art dealer (1899–1979)

- Pulitzer in 1962
- Born: 1899; Vienna, Austria-Hungary
- Died: 1979 (aged 79–80)
- Occupations: Art collector Gallery owner
- Years active: 1950s–1970s

Dr. Henry Franz Pulitzer (1899–1979) was an Austrian-born gallery owner and "avid art collector", and connoisseur. He was the owner of the Pulitzer galleries in London and Bern, Switzerland, and of the Isleworth Mona Lisa, a painting famous for the claim passed down from its previous owners that there was evidence that it was painted by Leonardo da Vinci. Pulitzer himself took up the cause of proving the claimed provenance of the painting, including writing a book in support of it, but his efforts did not lead to acceptance of the claim during his lifetime.

== Biography ==
Born in Vienna, then within Austria-Hungary, Pulitzer recalled developing a love of art at an early age, particularly remembering having a "passionate adoration of a Dombrovsky that had been relegated to his room", and disliking occasions in which his family would move it to the great hall for state occasions. Pulitzer was at one time "a gentleman-in-waiting" at the court of Zog I of Albania. In 1936, he attended a display at the Leicester Galleries, at which he first saw the painting known as the Isleworth Mona Lisa, then owned by English art collector Hugh Blaker, with Pulitzer later describing that as the point at which he had "fallen in love with it". In 1949, Pulitzer applied to the Home Secretary for naturalisation in the United Kingdom.

By the 1950s, Pulitzer had become the proprietor of the Pulitzer Gallery and the Pulitzer Studio at Kensington High Street in London. A 1953 Advertiser's Weekly article noted that "Pulitzer Studios of Kensington are the other 'all colour' firm" in the advertising field", and described a "teaming-up of Eugene Vernier, the outstanding French fashion photographer, with Dr. Henry F. Pulitzer, who, in recent years, has done much technical development work in colour and other fields". The piece also noted that Pulitzer's studio offered "a useful studio set construction unit". Pulitzer, however, became increasingly noted for his art collection. A 1958 display of watercolor paintings selected by Pulitzer drew attention, as did a 1959 display of "Minor English Masters", and later in 1959, he discovered "a fine specimen" of a rare painting by Caspar Netscher, "showing a shepherd and shepherdess in a sylvan setting with a sculptured group of a nymph, centaur and cupid in the background".

A 1962 account described Pulitzer as a connoisseur and art dealer in London and Bern. Pulitzer expressed strong opinions on the state of the art world, attributing the high price of classical art to the opinion that "no truly great art has been painted recently", and dismissing abstract paintings as "things that can be hung any one of four ways without making a difference". On December 7, 1962, he made news when he reported the theft of a painting by Borgognone that was shipped from London to Phoenix, Arizona, intended as a gift for the Phoenix Art Museum. The painting was shipped in a box with another larger painting, by Desportes, but when the box was opened, only the Desportes was found. Agents of the Federal Bureau of Investigation investigated the disappearance, and found the missing Borgognone the next day in the same box, "under piles of excelsior". By February 1963, Pulitzer recounted making a trip to Phoenix, Arizona "intending to stay for three days" before leaving for California, but instead staying for three months out of fascination with the artwork that had been collected locally, noting for example "a magnificent terracotta by Andrea della Robbia, covering a whole wall specially built to house it" some miles from Scottsdale.

A 1969 account lamenting the tendency of art dealers to break up collections noted:

There is, however, at least in London, Dr. Henry Pulitzer, whose Pulitzer Gallery is in Kensington High Street, just by the Royal Garden Hotel, has for some years been amassing a collection of pictures on the theme of the "Temptation of St. Anthony." This remarkable lot of varying versions of the sins of the flesh is well worth seeing, but although Dr. Pulitzer too has been sorely tempted to sell individual items, like St. Anthony he has resisted and the collection remains intact, to be sold as a lot.

In 1979, Ronald Hambleton acknowledged Pulitzer for providing details about a painting by Hieronymus Bosch previously incorrectly attributed to Herri met de Bles.

Henry F. Pulitzer has been confused in some sources with Joseph Pulitzer (1847-1911), publisher of the New York World and other newspapers (e.g. "den New Yorker Verleger and Multimilliardär Henry F. Pulitzer"). They may have been relatives. Henry F. Pulitzer was not a publisher.

== Advocacy of the Isleworth Mona Lisa ==
In 1962, Pulitzer purchased the Isleworth Mona Lisa from Blaker, acquiring it from the Blaker estate by selling his own Kensington estate and all its contents. Blaker and his father-in-law John R. Eyre had previously asserted that the work was painted by Leonardo da Vinci, and had gained some support for this claim through examination by experts including Paul George Konody, Archibald Cecil Chappelow, Arduino Colasanti, and Adolfo Venturi.

Pulitzer wrote and published a book, Where is the Mona Lisa? in 1966, presenting the case that the Isleworth Mona Lisa was the unfinished portrait of Lisa del Giocondo by Leonardo da Vinci, and that the Mona Lisa in the Louvre was a copy of this work. Art historian Jean-Pierre Isbouts asserts of Pulitzer that despite his success as a publisher he was "not a very talented author", concluding that "[h]is unfortunate 1966 book about the painting, filled with uppercase screeds... did far more harm than good, and ensured that no self-respecting art historian would go near the work".

Around the same time, Lord Brownlow also claimed to have a version of the Mona Lisa that was original to da Vinci. Brownlow and Pulitzer genially disputed who had the "real" Mona Lisa in the press, and both offered to show their respective Mona Lisa paintings at a London exhibition in 1972. Pulitzer continued to press his belief in the authenticity of the Isleworth Mona Lisa in the 1970s. Martin Kemp, a skeptic with respect to the origin of the Isleworth Mona Lisa, nevertheless noted that he "enjoyed a short correspondence with Pulitzer during the 1970s, by which time the Pulitzer Gallery in London was no longer in business", and that Pulitzer had sent Kemp a photograph of the painting.

== Personal life and death ==
In his later years, Pulitzer was described as living "in a fortress-like flat, guarded by a plethora of electronic devices, in Kensington High Street". He died in 1979, leaving the Isleworth Mona Lisa to his girlfriend in his will. It then spent decades in the vault of a Swiss bank, from which it emerged to renewed attention in the art world and in the media in the 2010s.
