= Peregrine Cust, 6th Baron Brownlow =

British peer and courtier (1899–1978)

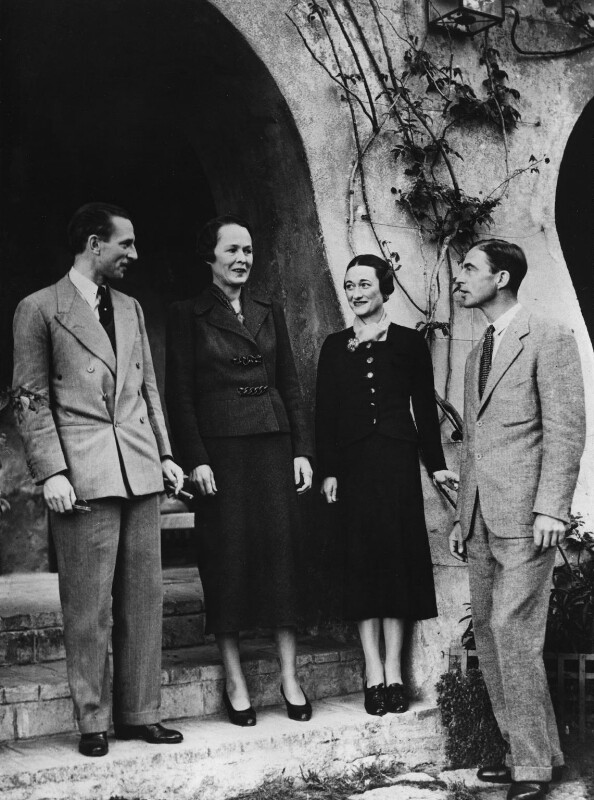
Herman Rogers; Katherine Rogers; Wallis, Duchess of Windsor; Peregrine Francis Adelbert Cust, 6th Baron Brownlow, Daily Express, 1936

Peregrine Francis Adelbert Cust, 6th Baron Brownlow (27 April 1899 – 28 July 1978), often known as Perry Brownlow, was a British peer and courtier. He was the son of Adelbert Salusbury Cockayne Cust, 5th Baron Brownlow, and his wife Maud Buckle.

== Early life ==
Brownlow was educated at Eton, and the Royal Military College, Sandhurst, later being commissioned into the Grenadier Guards. He fought in the First World War and left the Army in 1926 with the rank of lieutenant.

In 1927, he succeeded his father as 6th Baron Brownlow and to Belton House, near Grantham, Lincolnshire.

== Inter-war years ==
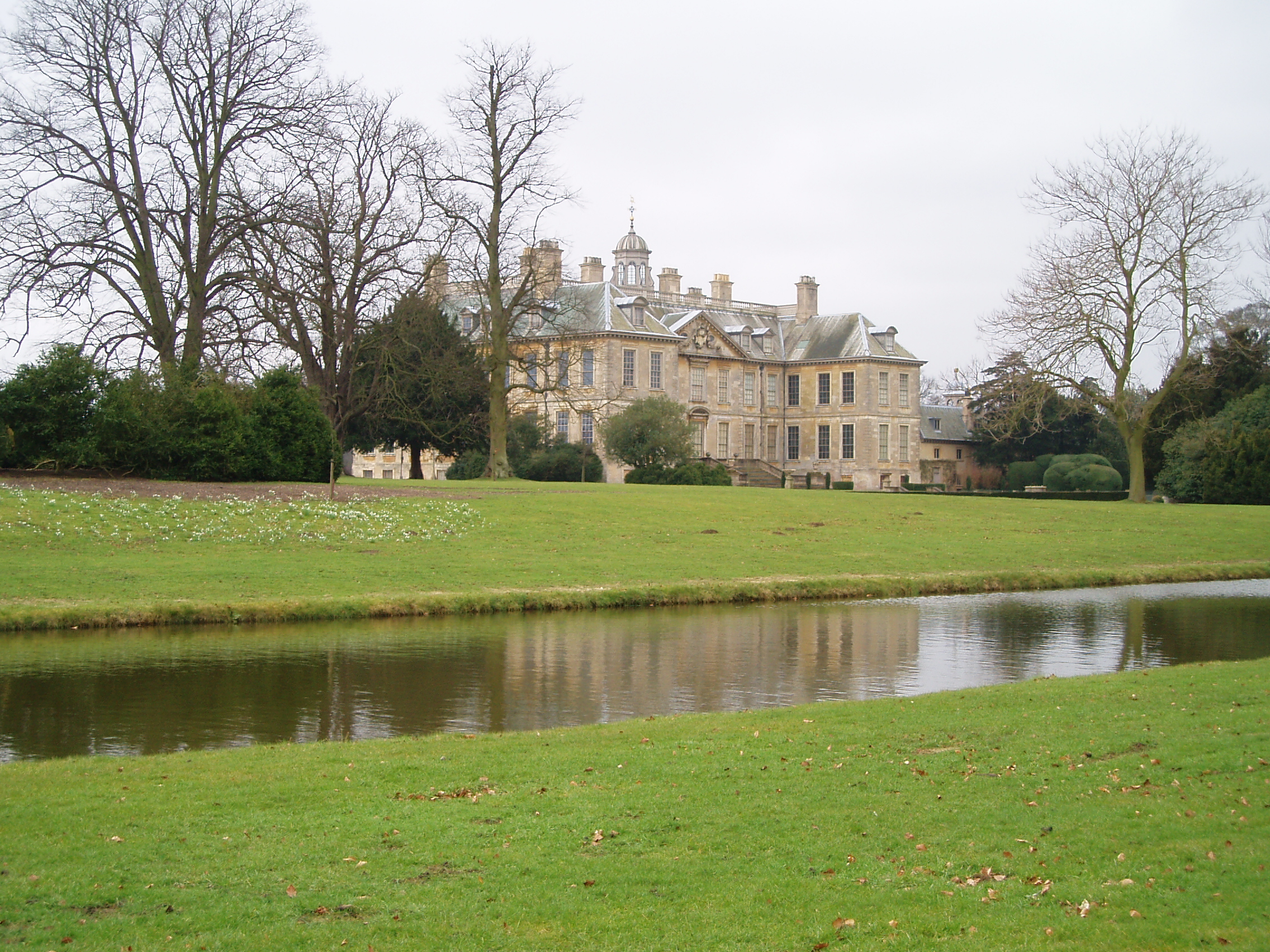
Belton House, the ancestral home of the Cust family

Brownlow was Mayor of Grantham from 1934 to 1935. He also served as Lord Lieutenant of Lincolnshire from 1936 to 1950.

During the 1930s, Brownlow was a close friend and equerry to the Prince of Wales, and later Lord-in-waiting when he became King Edward VIII. The Prince spent many weekends at Brownlow's country house, Belton House, but it is not known whether his future wife, Wallis Simpson, ever spent time at Belton. Upon Edward VIII's accession to the throne, Lord Brownlow became heavily involved in the abdication crisis which followed the new King's intention to marry Simpson. Brownlow personally accompanied Simpson on her flight to France to escape the media attention, and encouraged Simpson to renounce the idea of marriage to the King. Returning to England, Brownlow attempted to enlist the support of the King's mother Queen Mary, but she refused to receive him.

Following the abdication of Edward VIII, Lord Brownlow attempted to extricate himself from the former King's circle, refusing to attend the Duke of Windsor's marriage ceremony in 1937. For this, Edward and his wife, now the Duke and Duchess of Windsor, regarded Brownlow as disloyal. The Duchess in particular never forgave the man who had once championed her.

Brownlow read without prior warning in the Court Circular that he had been replaced as the sovereign's Lord-in-waiting. Telephoning Buckingham Palace for an explanation, he was given the curt information that his resignation had been accepted – but he had never tendered it. It was also made clear to him that the new king and his wife, Queen Elizabeth, had ordered that Brownlow's name was never to appear in the Court Circular again.

== World War II service ==
In 1939, he was commissioned into the Royal Air Force Volunteer Reserve Administrative and Special Duties Branch.

He was briefly involved in national politics when he served as Parliamentary Private Secretary to the Minister of Aircraft Production Lord Beaverbrook from 1940 to 1941.

He was promoted to Flying Officer in 1941 and Flight Lieutenant in 1943; He resigned his commission in March 1944 as Acting Squadron Leader.

== Post-war ==
By the 1970s, Brownlow came into possession of a painting that he believed to be another version of the Mona Lisa, and to also have been painted by Leonardo da Vinci, supporting the two–Mona Lisa theory. Brownlow and Henry F. Pulitzer, owner of the Isleworth Mona Lisa, for which a similar claim was made, genially disputed who had the "real" Mona Lisa in the press, and both offered to show their respective Mona Lisa paintings at a London exhibition in 1972.

== Personal life ==
Lord Brownlow married three times. In 1927, he married Katherine, daughter of Brigadier General Sir David Alexander Kinloch, 11th Baronet. They had three children. After his first wife's death in 1952, he married secondly Dorothy, daughter of Thomas Sarsfield Power, in 1954. She died in 1966 and Brownlow married thirdly Leila Joan, Lady Manton (d.1983), widow of George Miles Watson, 2nd Baron Manton (d.1968) and daughter of Major Philip Guy Reynolds DSO, in 1969. He died in July 1978, aged 79, and was succeeded in his titles by his second but eldest surviving son, Edward John Peregrine Cust, 7th Baron Brownlow.

The National Trust are now the owners of Belton House, Brownlow's former seat, in Lincolnshire. He was also the owner at least three estates in the Caribbean, including in Jamaica and Grenada.

== See also ==
- William Denis Kendall mid-20th century MP for Grantham and subject of MI5 surveillance.

== Notes ==
Honorary titles
Preceded by The Earl of Yarborough	Lord Lieutenant of Lincolnshire; 1936–1950	Succeeded by Lord Willoughby de Eresby
Peerage of Great Britain
Preceded by Adelbert Cust	Baron Brownlow; 1927–1978	Succeeded by Edward Cust
