= Lorenzo Cecconi =

Italian Painter

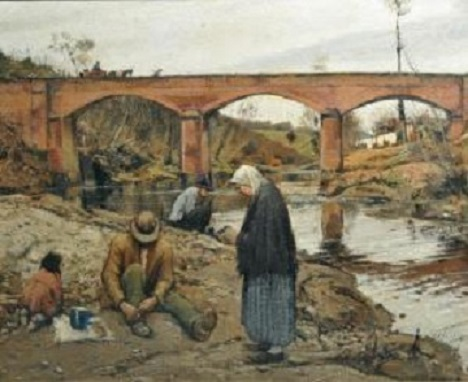
Sul greto del Pesa a Montelupo Fiorentino

Lorenzo Cecconi (13 August 1863 – April 1947) was an Italian painter, restorer, and curator.

== Background ==
Born in Rome, Lorenzo Cecconi was the son of a painting restorer. He studied in Rome at the Accademia di San Luca, under the guidance of Aurelio Tiratelli. He painted in oil and watercolors, focusing on rural landscapes and figures, such as the Lavandaie di Ceccano, a painting that was exhibited at the Amatori e Cultori Society in Rome in 1886. He preferred the tonal range of greens and grays, to represent the light effect, a little melancholy, of the rain and the overcast sky. Among his works: Pineta di Ostia and Collection of Reeds.

1890: at the International Exhibition of the City of Rome some works by Lorenzo Cecconi, including Verso sera (painting which is considered his masterpiece) and Returning from the country, are noted by Giovanni Costa (called Nino). King Umberto I purchases one of his paintings.
1900: his landscapes, The torrent and Autumn rain are exhibited at the Milan Triennale. 1901: his painting Between yes and no is exhibited at the Roman exhibition of the In arte libertas Association.
1902: Farewell is exposed. In 1904, Cecconi entered the "XXV della Campagna Romana", with the nickname "Chanterelle".
1913: When the stolen Mona Lisa was recovered in 1913, after having been taken from the Louvre some years earlier, Cecconi was called on by the Italian government to examine the picture and ascertain whether it had received any damage, giving Cecconi "a unique opportunity of knowing every detail of the Louvre picture".

== As Curator ==
While Cecconi was serving as curator of the Academy of Santa Luca, he called at the Grand Hotel and spent a considerable time minutely examining the Isleworth Mona Lisa, finding of the painting that "this is an original of Leonardo: the 'morbidezza', the condition of the 'crepatura' are unique and exactly equivalent to that of the Louvre example". He later wrote a letter expanding on this assessment, stating:

From an examination made of the picture representing La Gioconda, the property of Mr. J. R. Eyre, I have been able to observe that the technique of the picture resembles that of the picture representing the same subject existing in Paris. Regarding the originality of it, in some details it differs from that of the Louvre: in fact, observing the locks of hair falling on the right shoulder, these do not correspond exactly to the above-mentioned picture; as also the border around the neck differs in small details. What is remarkable is the fusion of the tints of the flesh, especially in the eyes; the line which designs the nose, the mouth, and the oval of the face. In my opinion, given the historical data collected by Mr. Eyre, this may be a second work of the Great Leonardo. (Signed) LORENZO CECCONI.

From his long stay in India to carry out restorations, Cecconi reported studies of oriental taste that he exhibited at the Colonial Exhibition of 1934. He has also participated in exhibitions in Palermo, Naples, Berlin, Vienna, Barcelona and Chicago. He twice won the "Werstappen" landscape prize, offered by the Accademia di San Luca.

=== Restoration of Ajanta Ellora caves ===
During the early 1920s, the Ajanta site was in the territory of the princely state of the Hyderabad, India. and (the last Nizam of Hyderabad) appointed experts to restore the artwork, converted the site into a museum and built a road to enable tourists come to the site.

The Nizam's Director of Archaeology obtained the services of Professor Lorenzo Cecconi, assisted by Count Orsini, to restore the paintings in the caves. The Director of Archaeology for the last Nizam of Hyderabad said of the work of Cecconi and Orsini:

The repairs to the caves and the cleaning and conservation of the frescoes have been carried out on such sound principles and in such a scientific manner that these matchless monuments have found a fresh lease of life for at least a couple of centuries.

== Bibliography ==
- Renato Mammucari, the 25th of the Roman countryside, Albano Laziale, Vela, 1984. Preface by Paolo Emilio Trastulli
- Renato Mammucari, The painters of mal'aria: from the Roman countryside to the Pontine Marshes: views and customs of the Agro through the paintings of Italian and foreign artists who left their memory before the radical transformation of the environment and the territory, Rome, Newton & Compton, 1988. Co-author Rigel Langella.
- Lando Scotoni, Geographical definition of the Roman countryside, in Acts of the Accademia Nazionale dei Lincei, Class of Moral, Historical and Philological Sciences, Rendiconti, series 9, v. 4, fasc. 4, 390 (1993).
- Renato Mammucari, Roman countryside: geographical maps - perspective plans - panoramic views - picturesque costumes, Città di Castello, Edimond, 2002.
- Renato Mammucari, the 25th of the Roman countryside: 1904-2004, Marigliano, LER, 2005.
- Richard Cohen, Beyond Enlightenment: Buddhism, Religion, Modernity (2006), p. 51.
