= The Mona Lisa Myth =

- Cover of the 2013 book.
- Directed by: Jean-Pierre Isbouts
- Written by: Jean-Pierre Isbouts
- Based on: The Mona Lisa Myth (book, 2013), by Jean-Pierre Isbouts and Christopher Heath Brown
- Starring: Morgan Freeman (narrator)
- Distributed by: Pantheon Studios
- Release date: March 2014
- Running time: 86 minutes
- Country: United States
- Language: English

The Mona Lisa Myth is a multimedia project consisting of a 2013 book and a 2014 documentary film, produced in tandem by Renaissance scholar and art historian Jean-Pierre Isbouts, with physician and art collector Christopher Heath Brown as co-author of the book and as a producer of the documentary, the latter with narration by Morgan Freeman. The book and film each examine the history of the Mona Lisa, and the longstanding theory that the Isleworth Mona Lisa is an earlier version of the same painting, also by Leonardo da Vinci.

== Thesis ==
The project examines the history and events behind the Mona Lisa in the Louvre and the Isleworth Mona Lisa, supporting the findings of previous researchers attributing the Isleworth Mona Lisa to Leonardo. The companion film was shot in Florence, Italy, and released in March 2014. Describing his first examination of the Isleworth Mona Lisa, Isbouts related that he was "sceptical but intrigued", stating, "I walked into the vault, it was very cold in there, and I spent about two hours with that painting. But after five minutes I recognised that this had to be a Leonardo". He described being "absolutely floored" by the quality of the preservation and the "intense luminosity of the face".

Isbouts presented a theory that the Isleworth Mona Lisa is an earlier work by Leonardo, and is the original portrait of the Florentine subject, "while the Mona Lisa in the Louvre is an allegorical representation of the Madonna Annunziata". He further noted that "24 of 27 recognised Leonardo scholars have agreed this is a Leonardo". One author notes: "In their book The Mona Lisa Myth, art historians Jean-Pierre Isbouts and Christopher Heath Brown suggest that there is historical evidence pointing to the painting's authenticity: back in 1550, Leonardo's biographer Georgio Vasari had referred to an unfinished Mona Lisa in his book Lives of the Most Excellent Painters, Sculptors, and Architects".

In addition to Morgan Freeman's narration, the film also stars Alessandro Demcenko and Peter Xifo as younger and older versions of Leonardo da Vinci, and Raffaela O'Neill as the painting's subject, Lisa Gherardini. Isbouts and Brown later co-authored several other books on related subjects, including Young Leonardo: The Evolution of a Revolutionary Artist, 1472-1499 (2017), presenting a theory that Leonardo also painted two versions of The Last Supper, with the second being a replica of the first painted on canvas at the request of Louis XII of France. and The da Vinci Legacy: How an Elusive 16th-Century Artist Became a Global Pop Icon (2019).
