= Marco d'Oggiono =

Italian painter (c.1470-c.1540)

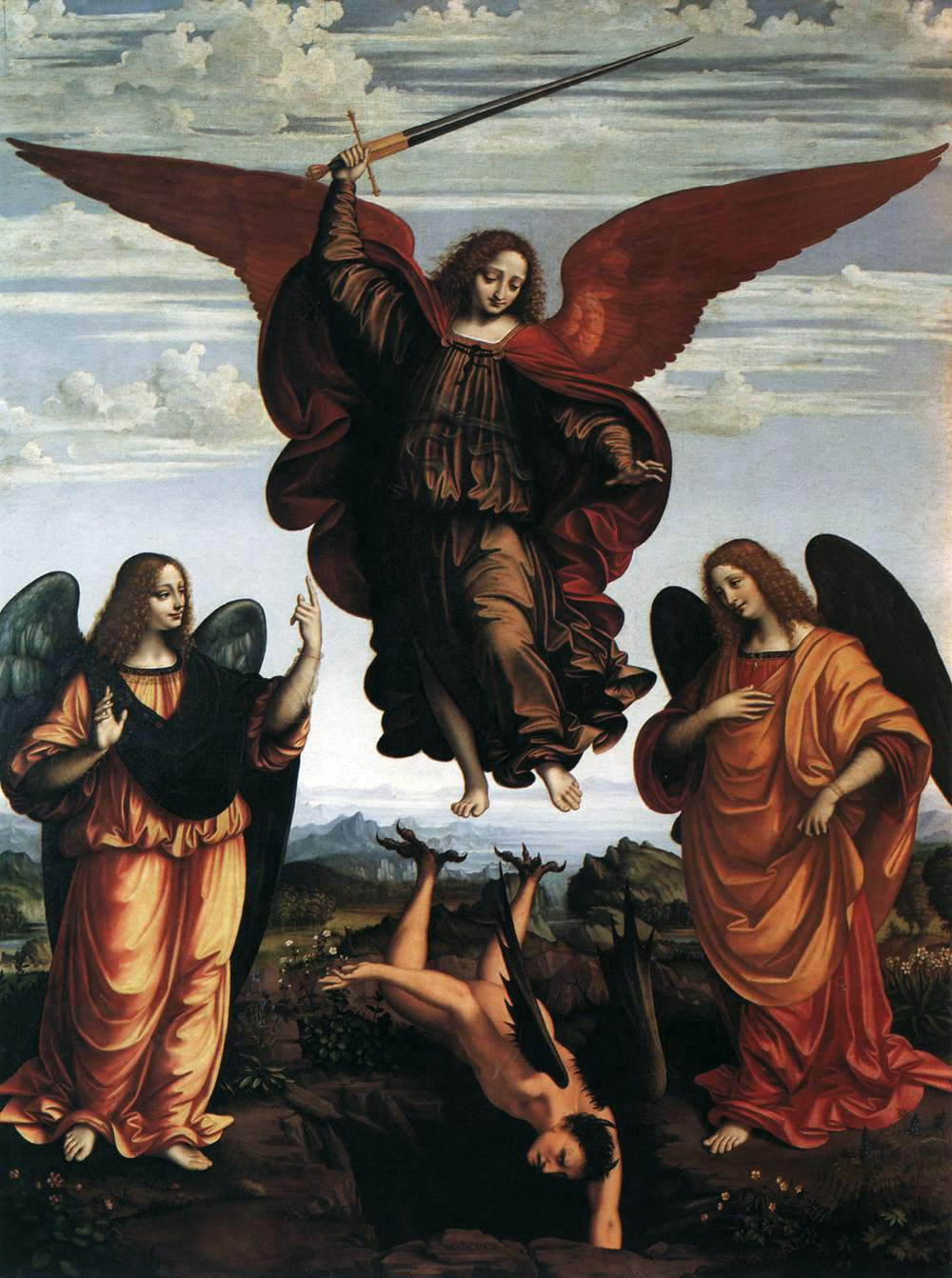
Pala dei Tre Arcangeli, Pinacoteca di Brera, Milan

Marco d'Oggiono (c. 1470 – c. 1549) was an Italian Renaissance painter and a chief pupil of Leonardo da Vinci, many of whose works he copied.

== Biography and works ==
He was born at Oggiono near Milan. Little is known of his life—not even the date of his important series of frescoes painted for the church of Santa Maria della Pace in Milan. He probably died in Milan. Luigi Lanzi gave 1530 as the date of his death, but various writers in Milan say it took place in 1540, and now the best accepted date is 1549.

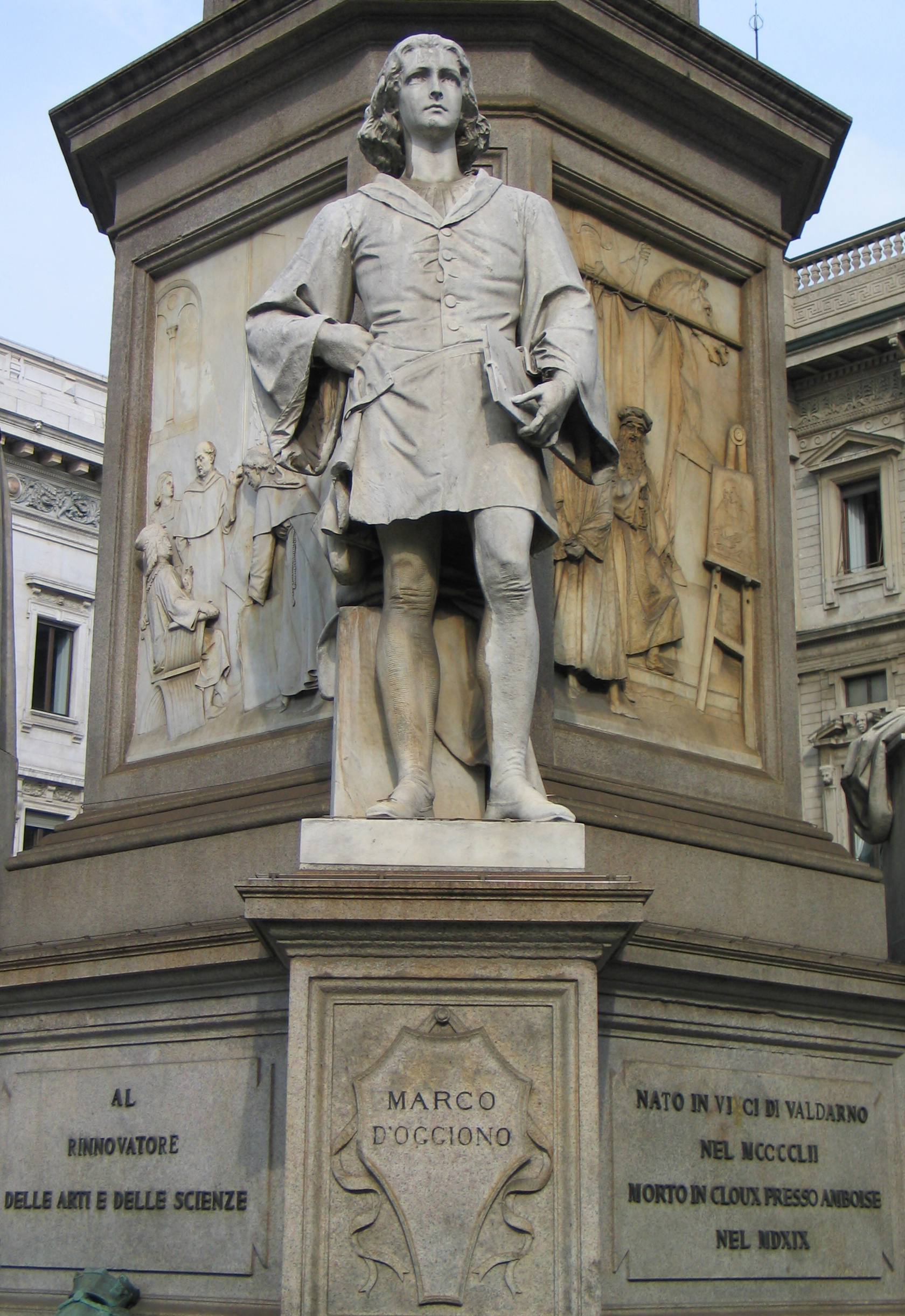
Figure of Marco d'Oggiono at the pedestal of Leonardo da Vinci monument. Milan, Piazza della Scala. Sculptor Pietro Magni

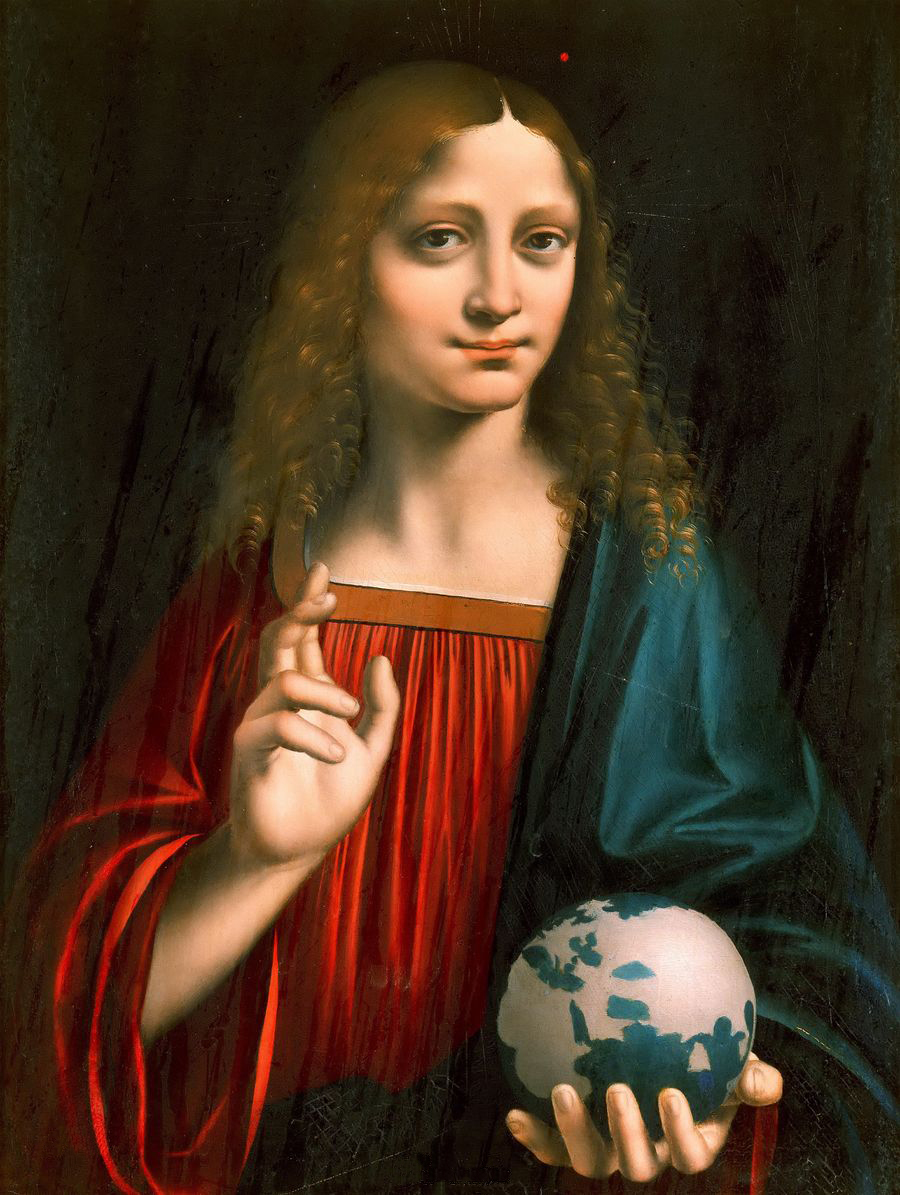
Salvator Mundi, c.1500

He was a hard-working artist, but his work has since been criticized by some for being wanting in vivacity of feeling and purity of drawing, while, in his composition, it has been well said that "intensity of color does duty for intensity of sentiment". He copied Leonardo's Last Supper repeatedly, and one of his best copies is in the possession of the Royal Academy of Arts. The Hungarian art critic Paul George Konody, in examining the Isleworth Mona Lisa, wrote of that painting:

The hands, with their careful and somewhat hard drawing and terra cotta coloring, suggest at once the name of Leonardo's pupil, Marco d' Oggionno; whereas the inimitably soft and lovely painting of the head and bust, the exquisite subtlety of the expression, the golden glow of the general coloring, can be due only to Leonardo".

His two most notable pictures—one in the Pinacoteca di Brera (representing St. Michael), and the other in the private gallery of the Bonomi family (representing the Madonna)—are signed with his name in Latin, "Marcus".

Other works by d'Oggiono can be seen at Berlin, Paris, St. Petersburg and Turin, the one in Russia being a clever copy of the Last Supper by Leonardo. The Catholic Encyclopedia said of d'Oggiono, "[h]e cannot be regarded as an important artist, or even a very good copyist, but in his pictures the sky and mountains and the distant landscapes are always worthy of consideration, and in these we probably get the painter's best original work."

== Sources ==
- Marco D'Oggione at New Advent
- Leonardo da Vinci, Master Draftsman, exhibition catalog fully online as PDF from The Metropolitan Museum of Art, which contains material on Marco d'Oggiono (see index)
