= Operation Valkyrie: The Stauffenberg Plot to Kill Hitler =

- Cover of the DVD for the documentary.
- Directed by: Jean-Pierre Isbouts
- Written by: Jean-Pierre Isbouts, William A. Schwartz
- Cinematography: Alicia Robbins
- Release date: 2008
- Running time: 76 minutes
- Country: United States
- Language: English

Operation Valkyrie: The Stauffenberg Plot to Kill Hitler is a 2008 documentary film about the 20 July plot to assassinate Adolf Hitler, directed by Jean-Pierre Isbouts.

Described as "[a] well-produced 76-minute television documentary", it has been noted as showing "the advantages offered by a film treatment of a topic" as compared to an account in print. The documentary "begins with the events of July 20, 1944 and moves back to earlier phases in the life of Claus von Stauffenberg, as well as to key earlier events in German history". It was further noted that "the coverage of main highlights concerning the rise of Nazism and Hitler's takeover is somewhat cursory", but that "the background of the other major plotters is done very well. The treatment of the nature of the bomb that Stauffenberg brought in his briefcase to the Wolf's Lair on July 20 is explained quite effectively, as are the construction of the bunker where the meeting was supposed to be held and the map room where it was moved because of the hot weather".

Through the use of 3D modeling and rotation of "diagrams of the room itself and of the huge oak conference table, both of which were crucial to the effect of the bomb blast", Isbouts "achieve[d] a much higher level of vividness and clarity than is possible with the printed word", and "demonstrate[d] much more effectively" how "the move to the map room saved Hitler's life – because the windows allowed much of the blast's force to be dissipated outward and the oak table shielded him". The documentary has been described as "more informative than the feature film", Valkyrie, released the same year. The DVD version of the documentary also contains two hours of bonus features, "including Eva Braun's home movies and a rundown on the other Hitler-assassination plots".
