= Jean-Pierre Isbouts =

Dutch-American academic (born 1954)

- Born: 1954 (age 71–72); Eindhoven, Netherlands
- Occupations: Professor, historian, author, screenwriter, director
- Notable work: Charlton Heston's Hollywood; Walt: The Man Behind the Myth; National Geographic's The Biblical World: An Illustrated Atlas; National Geographic's In the Footsteps of Jesus; National Geographic's Who's Who in the Bible; The Mona Lisa Myth; The Story of Christianity: A Chronicle of Christian Civilization From Ancient Rome to Today
- Website: www.jpisbouts.org

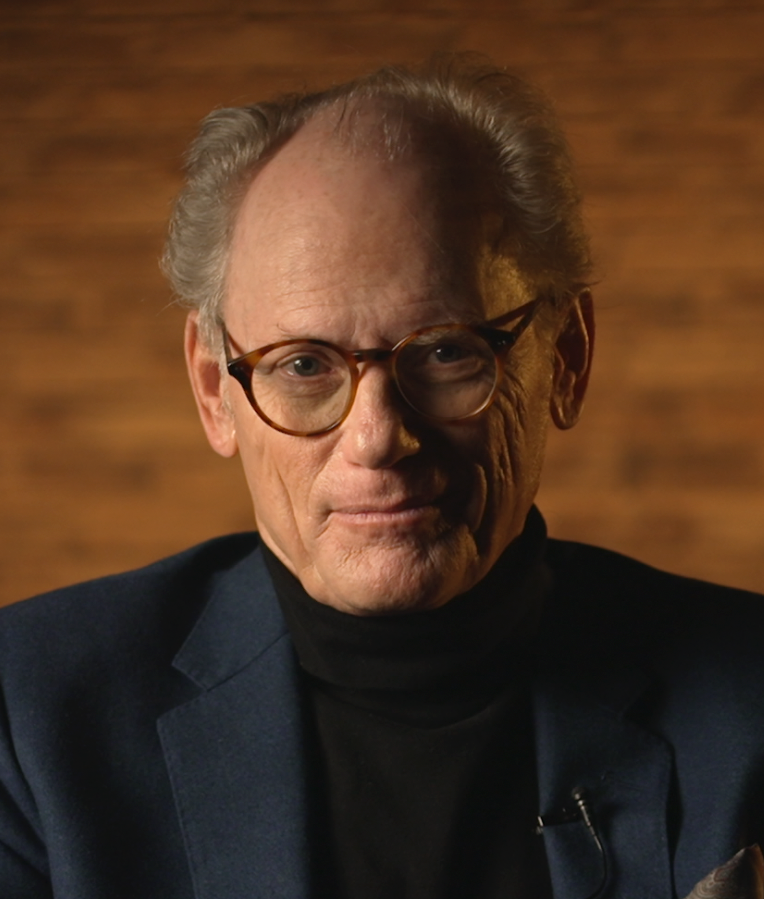
Prof. Jean-Pierre Isbouts, author and filmmaker

Jean-Pierre Isbouts (born 1954) is a professor in the Social Sciences PhD program of Fielding Graduate University in Santa Barbara, California, and an archaeologist, author, screenwriter, director, and producer of works addressing various historical periods, particularly the time period of Jesus and that of Renaissance and post-Renaissance art.

== Biography ==
=== Education and early works ===
Born in Eindhoven, the Netherlands, Isbouts studied Attic Greek and Latin, archaeology, art history and musicology at Leiden University in 1980. He received his PhD from Columbia University in New York, writing his dissertation on the American Beaux-Arts architecture firm of Carrère and Hastings. In 1983, Isbouts wrote and directed one of the first documentary works specifically created for the LaserDisc format, and "the first successful commercial videodisc to index and show art works". The piece, Van Gogh Revisited, was one side of Vincent Van Gogh: A Portrait in Two Parts, examining the life and works of Vincent van Gogh; the other side features a performance of the one-man-play by its author and co-director of the project, Leonard Nimoy.

Isbouts, as executive producer, expanded this into a Great Arts Series by 1991, with multiple installments allowing users to "explore art galleries and paintings while listening to music of the period", including installments on The French Impressionists (1991), The Art of the Czars (1992), and Dutch Masters of the 17th Century (1993). In 1995, having formed the production company Pantheon in Santa Monica, California, Isbouts extended his interests to the historical backdrop of Jesus, directing a four-hour "multimedia presentation of New Testament stories from the birth of Jesus to his Crucifixion and Resurrection" narrated by Charlton Heston, the first production of the series, Charlton Heston's Voyage through the Bible. In 1996, he produced Hamlet: The Game, a CD-ROM game of Shakespeare's Hamlet, combining material provided from the 1996 film adaptation by Kenneth Branagh with original footage, animation, and games and puzzles.

=== Writing and documentary directing career ===
Through his documentary work with Heston, in 1998 Isbouts came to coauthor Charlton Heston's Hollywood with the actor. In 2000, Isbouts presented a three-part series examining ancient cultural and religious prophesies, In 2001, Isbouts directed Walt: The Man Behind the Myth, a biographical documentary film about Walt Disney, narrated by Dick Van Dyke. In 2008, Isbouts directed Operation Valkyrie: The Stauffenberg Plot to Kill Hitler, on Operation Valkyrie, which was noted as showing "the advantages offered by a film treatment of a topic" as compared to accounts in print.

In November 2012, Isbouts again returned to Biblical history, publishing In the Footsteps of Jesus with National Geographic.

Isbouts paints a vivid portrait of the world as Jesus knew it, so scene-setting that Jesus doesn’t even appear as a topic until more than 100 pages into the 300-page book. Among other theories, Isbouts posits that Jesus was born near Nazareth, not Bethlehem; that he was a construction worker who toiled on new Roman cities rather than a carpenter; that he valued women as equal to men; and, perhaps most critically, that his ministry was as much about political and social activism as it was about religious belief.

In 2016, Isbouts published two additional books, Archaeology of the Bible: The Greatest Discoveries From Genesis to the Roman Era, also with National Geographic; and Ten Prayers that Changed the World. A 2020 Houston Chronicle article noted that "Isbouts has two main passions: the message of the historical Jesus and the artists who shared and represented those sentiments". A musicologist, Isbouts also produced recordings for several of his films.

=== Investigations of the Mona Lisa and Leonardo da Vinci ===
In October 2013, Isbouts published another book examining a Renaissance art theme, The Mona Lisa Myth, examining the history and events behind the Mona Lisa in the Louvre and the Isleworth Mona Lisa, endorsing the two-Mona Lisa theory and confirming the latter's attribution to Leonardo. A companion film was released in March 2014, also directed by Isbouts, with narration by Morgan Freeman. Describing his first examination of the Isleworth Mona Lisa, Isbouts related that he was "sceptical but intrigued", stating, "I walked into the vault, it was very cold in there, and I spent about two hours with that painting. But after five minutes I recognised that this had to be a Leonardo". He described being "absolutely floored" by the quality of the preservation and the "intense luminosity of the face".

Isbouts presented a theory that the Isleworth Mona Lisa is an earlier work by Leonardo, and is the original portrait of the Florentine subject, "while the Mona Lisa in the Louvre is an allegorical representation of the Madonna Annunziata". He further noted that "24 of 27 recognised Leonardo scholars have agreed this is a Leonardo".

In his 2017 book, Young Leonardo: The Evolution of a Revolutionary Artist, 1472-1499, also coauthored with Brown, Isbouts presents a theory that Leonardo also painted two versions of The Last Supper, with the second being a replica of the first painted on canvas at the request of Louis XII of France. In 2019, the pair published The da Vinci Legacy: How an Elusive 16th-Century Artist Became a Global Pop Icon. That same year, Isbouts edited and wrote a section of Leonardo da Vinci's Mona Lisa: New Perspectives, further exploring the evidence of Leonardo having painted the Isleworth Mona Lisa.

== Works ==
=== Books ===
- The Dalí Legacy (Apollo Publishers, 2020), with Christopher Heath Brown
- Leonardo da Vinci's Mona Lisa: New Perspectives (Fielding University Press, 2019), as editor and contributing author
- The Da Vinci Legacy (Apollo Publishers, 2019), with Christopher Heath Brown
- The Search for Heaven: A historian investigates the case for the afterlife (Pantheon Press, 2019)
- The Angels of War: A Novel of World War I (Pantheon Press, 2018)
- Young Leonardo: The Evolution of a Revolutionary Artist, 1472-1499 (Thomas Dunne Books, 2017), with Christopher Heath Brown
- Archaeology of the Bible: The Greatest Discoveries From Genesis to the Roman Era (National Geographic, 2016)
- Ten Prayers That Changed the World (National Geographic, 2016)
- Jesus: An Illustrated Life (National Geographic, 2015)
- The Story of Christianity: A Chronicle of Christian Civilization From Ancient Rome to Today (National Geographic, 2014)
- The Mona Lisa Myth (Pantheon Press, 2013), with Christopher Heath Brown
- Angels in Flanders: A Novel of World War I (Pantheon Press, 2013)
- National Geographic's Who's Who in the Bible (National Geographic, 2013)
- National Geographic's In the Footsteps of Jesus (National Geographic, 2012)
- From Moses to Muhammad: The Shared Origins of Judaism, Christianity and Islam (2011)
- Young Jesus: Restoring the "Lost Years" of a Social Activist and Religious Dissident (Sterling Publishing, 2008)
- National Geographic's The Biblical World: An Illustrated Atlas (National Geographic, 2007)
- Charlton Heston's Hollywood (GT Publishing, 1998), with Charlton Heston

=== Filmography ===
Year	Title	Functioned as	Notes
2017	The Search for the Last Supper	Writer, director	TV movie documentary
2014	The Mona Lisa Myth	Writer, director	TV movie documentary
2008	Operation Valkyrie: The Stauffenberg Plot to Kill Hitler	Writer, director	Video documentary
2007	Beyond 'The Golden Compass': The Magic of Philip Pullman	Writer, director	Video documentary
2005	The Quest for Peace	Writer, director	TV movie
2004	Howard Hughes: The Real Aviator	Writer	Video documentary
2001	Walt: The Man Behind the Myth	Writer, director	Documentary series episode
1999	Inside the Cold War with Sir David Frost	Writer	TV movie documentary
1997	Terror on the Titanic	Director	Video documentary
1992	Dutch Masters of the 17th Century	Director	Video documentary
1992	The Art of the Czars	Director	Video documentary
1991	The French Impressionists	Director	Video documentary
