= Adolfo Venturi =

Italian art historian (1856–1941)

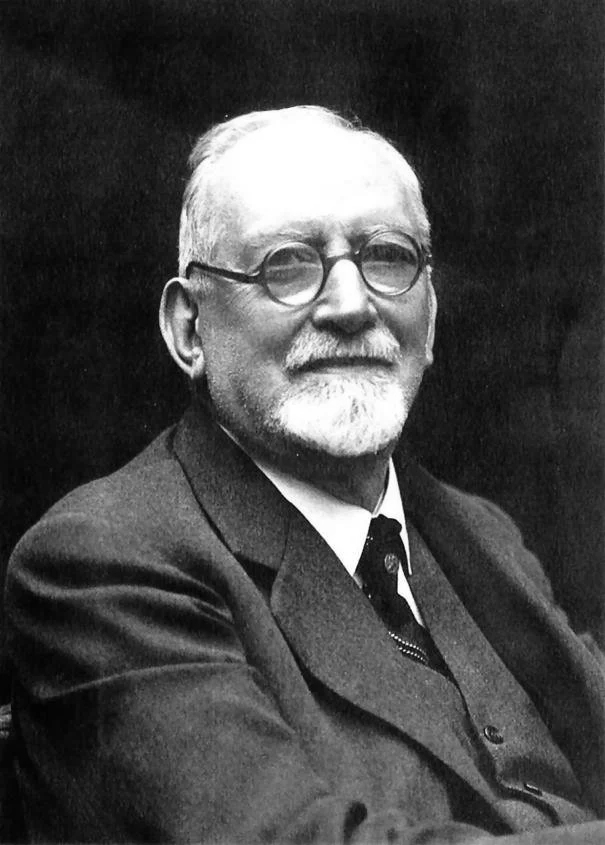
Adolfo Venturi

Adolfo Venturi (3 September 1856, Modena – 10 June 1941, Santa Margherita Ligure) was an Italian art historian. His son, Lionello Venturi, was also an art historian.

== Biography ==
He received his education in Modena and Florence, and in 1878 started working as a curator at the Galleria Estense in Modena. In 1888 he was appointed general inspector of the Accademia di Belle Arti di Roma. In 1888, with Domenico Gnoli, he founded the journal, "Archivio storico d'arte" (after 1901 it was called "L'Arte"). He would remain editor of the publication up until 1940. From 1896 to 1931 he served as chair of medieval and modern art at the University of Rome.

In 1923, author John R. Eyre reported Venturi's opinion on the Isleworth Mona Lisa, which had become known to the public a decade earlier, and was proposed to be a work of Leonardo da Vinci. According to Eyre:

Venturi said he thought the picture was mainly done on Leonardo's commencement by Ambrogio de Predis, who was Leonardo's partner (with Evangelisto de Predis) in the painting of the Madonna della Roccia, now in the National Gallery, London. He based this opinion on the hands, the heavy 'impasto' (laying on of paint) in the body portion between the bust and the hands. He stated that the picture was more beautiful than the Paris one, the compactness, the beauty of the eye drawing, which he says is the principal portion done by Leonardo together with the line of the mouth, mark it as a gem in the art world.

Pursuant to museum director Corrado Ricci's claim that La Scapigliata had been forged by its former owner, Gaetano Callani, causing it to be re-attributed as "by the school of Leonardo", Venturi asserted that the work was by Leonardo, and revealed evidence that sought to link the work with the House of Gonzaga.

In 1928, Venturi expressed doubt in a painting claimed to be Leonardo's Leda and the Swan which had been sold in an auction for $88,400. It was reported that Venturi, "while admitting that the execution is very fine and that the picture resembles the lost original, nevertheless declared that the painting is too precious, too classical, too elegant to be entirely a product from the master's brush". Venturi's reputation as an art expert was called upon in 1929 in the Hahn vs. Duveen court case, a sensational trial that centred on the authenticity of a version of Leonardo da Vinci's La Belle Ferronière. Venturi testified against the asserted authenticity, deeming the painting at issue to be a "low copy".

Venturi died in Santa Margherita Ligure at the age of 85.

== Published works ==
In 1901 he began publishing his magnum opus, "Storia dell'arte italiana", a multi-volume work on the history of Italian art that spanned from the Early Christian era to the 16th century. The following is a list of works by Venturi that have been published in English:

- "A short history of Italian art", English translation by Edward Hutton; New York, Macmillan Co. (1926).
- "Michelangelo", English translation by Joan Redfern (1928).
- "Giovanni Pisano, his life and work", Paris, The Pegasus Press; New York, Harcourt, Brace and Company (1929).
- "North Italian painting of the quattrocento: Lombardy, Piedmont, Liguria" (1974), English translation of "La pittura del Quattrocento nell'Emilia" and "La pittura del Quattrocento nell'alta Italia".
