= Arduino Colasanti =

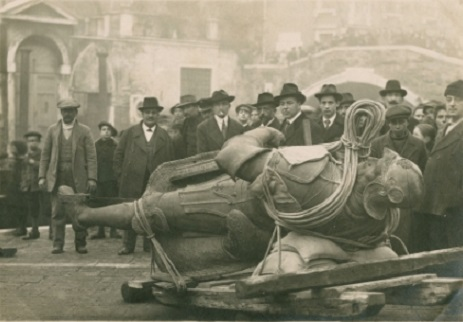
Arduino Colasanti assists in the dismantling of the monument to Bartolomeo Colleoni.

Arduino Colasanti (24 June 1877 – 23 November 1935) was an Italian Renaissance scholar who served as general director of the Department of Antiquity and Fine Arts in Rome.

== Biography ==
Born in Rome, Colasanti was the official representative of the Italian ministry of public instruction at the San Francisco Exposition in 1915. After spending four months there, he stated:

San Francisco's exhibition surpasses all other international exhibitions held in the last 15 years. From Paris to Brussels, from Ghent to Rome, from Turin to Buenos Aires. I have been to them all, either in connections with my own studies or officially as a representative of the Italian government, and it is my deep conviction that for magnificence or architecture, richness of decoration, adaptation to site, superb landscape gardening, variety of elements that compose it, San Francisco's is the most beautiful international exhibition ever held. Nothing finer, anywhere since the classic days.

Colasanti became General Director of Antiquity and Fine Arts in Rome. On January 12, 1920, Colasanti disseminated a tract titled 'Circular No. 13: Collection of Decorative Elements of Italian Peasant Art', of which it was written: "A Renaissance scholar turned bureaucrat, Colasanti urged superintendents, directors, gallery inspectors, artists and students of art to begin collecting peasant art before it was forever lost or destroyed, owing to what he perceived to be the threat of incipient industrialization and urbanization". Under Colasanti's leadership, Luigi Parpagliolo drafted legislation for the preservation of both natural and architectural locations, which was enacted in 1922. The legislation "stressed the intimate relationship between vernacular architecture and landscape that testified to the anthropological history of place".

In the early 1920s, Colasanti evaluated the Isleworth Mona Lisa, with his thoughts being recorded as follows:

Dr. Colasanti, Director-General of the Beaux Arts, was highly taken with the picture but said that he could not declare that it was totally Leonardo and was inclined to think that Melzi had done a great part of it. The hair he thought was Leonardo and the upper part with the eyes and nose of the face, but the throat muscle was wrong and did not give the idea of being able to turn round which was extremely noticeable in all throats painted by Leonardo. He had read Eyre's book but thought that more documentary evidence was necessary. He was particularly strong on the question of the hair. As a picture he stated that the value was extremely great, leaving aside the authenticity of Leonardo. It was undoubtedly of the same period and from Leonardo's studio, but how much he had to do with it was difficult to say. The background did not worry him, it was not Leonardo, whilst that of the Mona Lisa in Paris undoubtedly was and can be compared with that of the Madonna della Roccia. He excluded Ambrogio de Predis, as the laying on of the paint was too fine.

In the mid-1920s, Colasanti, in his capacity as director of the Italian Fine Arts institute, led excavations on the Island of Capri of sites thought to have been used for orgies of emperor Tiberius. Colasanti expressed his belief "that relics of classic arts he expects to find, will depict scenes in the life of the emperor". A 1933 evaluation of the impact of cultural relations between Argentina and Italy stated, "[i]n philosophy, fine arts, and antiquities, the lectures and debates given by men like Giovanni Calo and Arduino Colasanti, formerly director of the fine arts section of the Ministry of Education, were among the most important recently organized".

Colasanti died in Rome at the age of 58.

== Works ==
- Le stagioni nell'antichità e nell'arte cristiana, Roma, Società Editrice Dante Alighieri, 1901.
- Gubbio, Bergamo, Istituto italiano d'arti grafiche, 1905.
- L' Aniene, Bergamo, Istituto italiano d'arti grafiche, 1906.
- Loreto, Bergamo, Istituto italiano d'arti grafiche, 1910.
- Lorenzo e Jacopo Salimbeni da Sanseverino, Roma, Calzone, 1910.
- L'arte bisantina in Italia, prefazione di Corrado Ricci, Milano, Bestetti e Tumminelli, 1912.
- Case e palazzi barocchi di Roma, Milano, Bestetti & Tumminelli, 1913-1924.
- Le fontane d'Italia, Milano-Roma, Bestetti e Tumminelli, 1926.
- Medioevo artistico italiano, coperta e fregi del pittore Guido Marussig, Milano, Treves, 1927.
- Donatello, Roma, Casa Editrice d'Arte Valori Plastici, [dopo il 1929].
- La pittura del Quattrocento nelle Marche, Milano, Pantheon Edizioni d'arte, 1932.
