= Desportes =

Desportes is a French surname. Notable people with the surname include:

- Alexandre-François Desportes (1661–1743), French painter
- Émile Desportes (1878–1944), French classical composer and conductor
- Hélène Desportes (1620–1675)
- Narcisse Henri François Desportes (1776–1856), French botanist and bibliographer
- Nicolas Desportes (1718–1787), French painter
- Philippe Desportes (1546–1606), French poet
- Vincent Desportes (born 1953), French general and military theorist
- Yvonne Desportes (1907–1993), French classical composer, writer and music educator
