= John F. Asmus =

American physicist

- Born: January 20, 1937
- Died: March 31, 2024 (aged 87)
- Education: California Institute of Technology (Ph.D.)
- Known for: Pioneering use of lasers in art conservation
- Scientific career
- Workplaces: University of California, San Diego

John Fredrich Asmus (January 20, 1937 – March 31, 2024) was a research physicist who focused his work on the use of scientific techniques in art conservation. As of 2020, he taught at the Institute for Pure and Applied Physical Science at the University of California, San Diego, where he began working in 1974.

Asmus was widely published, with over 125 articles published in professional journals and 25 patents to his name. Having received his PhD from the California Institute of Technology, he initially applied his knowledge of high-energy excimer lasers in private sector organizations such as General Atomics, where he contributed to the ORION nuclear spaceship program. Asmus then pioneered the use of holography, lasers, ultrasonic imaging, digital image processing, and nuclear magnetic resonance in art conservation, working to preserve or investigate works as diverse as the statues in Venice, frescoes of the California State Capitol, petroglyphs in Utah's Arches National Park, portraits by Rembrandt, the Terracotta Army in Xi'an, China, and the Mona Lisa.

== Early life, education, and career ==
Born in Chicago, Illinois, to William F. and Eleanor Emma (Kocher) Asmus, the family moved to San Diego, California, in 1940. In the early 1950s, they moved to Montclair, California, where Asmus attended Chaffey High School.

Asmus worked for General Atomic in La Jolla, until 1969, when he went to the Institute for Defense Analyses in Washington, D.C., remaining there for two years and moving to Albuquerque, New Mexico, in 1971 to work for Science Applications International Corporation. In 1974, he became a research physicist with the Institute for Pure and Applied Physical Sciences at the University of California, San Diego.

== Pioneering use of lasers in art conservation ==
In 1971, Asmus met oceanographer Walter Munk, who asked Asmus if he could make holograms of statues and art objects in Venice in order to preserve them. Through this process, Asmus discerned that he could use lasers to remove detritus encrusting the statues without harming the underlying works. In 1972, Asmus "first applied laser cleaning to marble sculptures", and therefore "is considered to be the grandfather of laser art conservation". That same year, Asmus worked with holography pioneer Ralph Wuerker, with whom he "proved the feasibility of creating full-size holograms of statuary, permitting three-dimensional reproductions of the world's sculptural masterpieces". Asmus continued working with Munk to create a three-dimensional record of the city of Venice in 1973, while continuing to investigate means of using lasers to clean statuary.

In 1975, Asmus developed "supersensitive sonar detectors" to assist art historian Carlo Pedretti and other scientists searching for The Battle of Anghiari, a lost painting by Leonardo da Vinci, at times referred to as "The Lost Leonardo", believed to be hidden beneath one of the later frescoes in the Salone dei Cinquecento (Hall of the Five Hundred) in the Palazzo Vecchio in Florence. In 1978, Asmus used laser technology to uncover artwork in the California State Capitol building that had been repeatedly painted over since a 1939 remodeling, ultimately removing nine layers of paint to restore the original artwork. In 1980, after vandals attempted to use an abrasive kitchen cleanser to deface ancient petroglyphs in Arches National Park in Utah, Asmus was called in to use his technology to repair the damage, and "succeeded in removing most of the cleanser".

His application of complex scientific devices to art enabled Asmus to work on many of the world's most famous cultural objects, including the Mona Lisa. In the 1980s, Asmus "turned a personal fascination with the Mona Lisa into a five-year project to recapture the painting's original vitality". Pedretti had proposed that Leonardo had originally painted the Mona Lisa bare-breasted, and Asmus believed that he could determine whether this theory was correct, "using computer image enhancement techniques developed for interpreting satellite photographs". Asmus used computer image processing to examine images of the painting to determine how the colors would appear if they were not distorted by the yellowing of the aged varnish. By 1987, Asmus had discovered previously unknown evidence indicating that the subject had originally been painted with a necklace, which had apparently then been painted over by Leonardo. Asmus also determined that restorers had obscured mountains originally appearing in the background of the portrait, likely in order to emphasize foreground features.

In 1988, Asmus published his results from using this technology to compare the Isleworth Mona Lisa and the Louvre Mona Lisa, finding that they shared a signature frequency of degrees of lightness and darkness, which Asmus concluded indicated that the examined aspects of both paintings were painted by the same person. During this same period, Asmus also developed a plan to restore the Qin dynasty Terracotta Army in Xi'an, China, and to piece together a Renaissance fresco by Andrea Mantegna shattered by bombing in World War II. In 1990, he received a Rolex Enterprise Award for his conservation work on the terracotta warriors.

In 2016 Asmus revisited the Isleworth Mona Lisa with professors Vadim Parfenov and Jessie Elford, with the trio publishing the results of scientific examinations that established to their satisfaction that the same artist painted the face of both the Mona Lisa and the Isleworth Mona Lisa. In 2018, Asmus and Parfenov published findings on the application of the same technology to portraits by Rembrandt.

== Personal life and death ==
In 1963, Asmus married Barbara Ann Flaherty, with whom he had two daughters. Barbara preceded him in death. Asmus died at his home in La Jolla, California, on Easter Sunday, 2024, at the age of 87.
