= Hugh Blaker =

British art dealer, writer and painter (1873-1936)

- Hugh Blaker, circa 1905
- Born: Hugh Oswald Blaker; 13 December 1873; Worthing, Sussex
- Died: 8 September 1936 (aged 62); Isleworth on Thames, Middlesex
- Education: Cranleigh School Kent; Teddington Art School, London; Académie Julian, Paris; and Antwerp School of Art
- Known for: Painter, writer, critic, museum curator, art collector, dealer in Old Masters

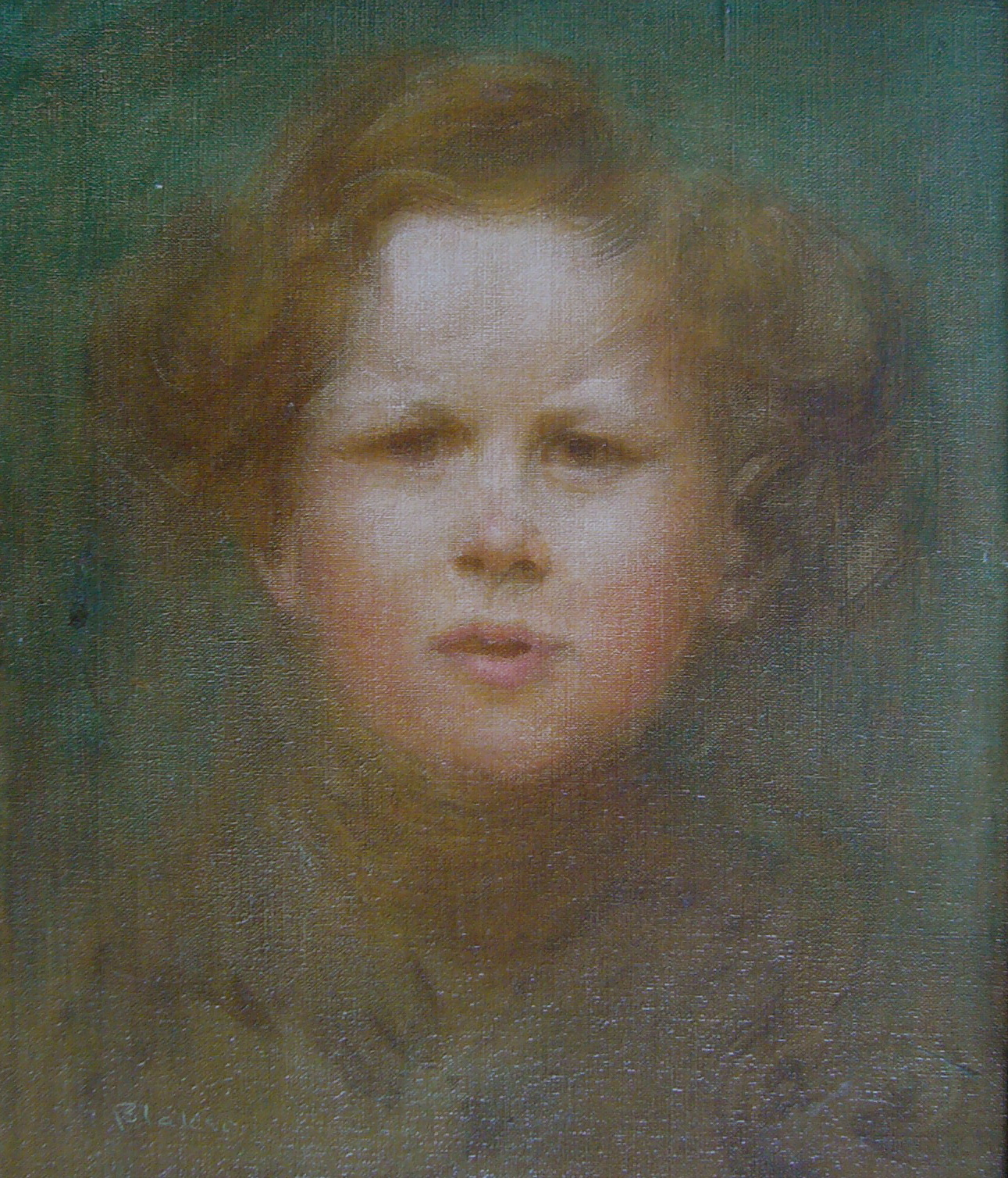
Hugh Blaker "Jack" oil on canvas on panel, 1911. Private collection, UK

Hugh Blaker (1873–1936) was an English artist, collector, connoisseur, dealer in Old Masters, museum curator, writer on art, and a supporter and promoter of modern British and French painters.

== Life and career ==
Hugh Oswald Blaker was born on 13 December 1873 at 31 Marine Parade, Worthing, Sussex. Both his parents were originally from Worthing – master builder Robert Charles Blaker (born May 1836) and Jane Rosalie Redstone (née Sanders, born April 1845). Following Robert's death, Jane married John Richard Eyre in the Church of the Sacred Heart, Teddington on 27 August 1898.

Blaker's collection of essays on social problems of the day, Points for Posterity (1910), paints a detailed portrait of its author: a free thinker, open minded, opinionated, cynical, reactionary, critical, and a socialist. The book – which in its manuscript form is titled Hints for Historians – opens: "There is no greater proof of stupidity than to be in love with your generation. Strong men are in love with the future and its manifold possibilities."

Blaker was curator of the Holburne Museum in Bath from 1905 to 1913 and is best known nowadays as adviser to the sisters Gwendoline and Margaret Davies of Llandinam, Wales, in the formation of their internationally renowned collection of French nineteenth-century painting and sculpture, which they bequeathed to the National Museum of Wales in Cardiff.

As well as his activities as dealer and advisor to the Davies sisters, Blaker assembled an important collection of art that he kept in his home at 53, 55 & 57 Church Street, Old Isleworth. After his death in 1936, Blaker's executors – his sister Jane (Jenny Louisa Roberta Blaker, 1869–1947) and the artist Murray Urquhart – sold over 600 artworks at auction and through two exhibitions at the Leicester Galleries, London (1937 & 1948). From 1895, Jane was governess to the young Gwendoline and Margaret Davies. She remained with them as companion throughout her life, firstly at Plas Dinam and from the early 1920s at Gregynog Hall, near Newtown, Montgomeryshire. When Hugh Blaker died in 1936, Jane presented from his art collection Amedeo Modigliani's Le Petit Paysan (1919) to the Tate Gallery and Quentin Massys' The Ugly Duchess (c. 1513) to the National Gallery in London in his memory.

From 1924, Blaker became guardian to the 16-year-old William Hartnell. Blaker had found Hartnell flyweight boxing near King's Cross, London. Hartnell was an illegitimate child from the London slums. Blaker gave him a home and sent him to the Italia Conti Academy of the Theatre Arts. While Hartnell made numerous stage and television appearances and acted in over 75 British films, he is best remembered today as BBC Television's first Doctor Who (1963–1966). When Hartnell married, he and his wife continued to live in one of Blaker's adjacent properties at Isleworth; their first child, Heather, was born there in 1929.

In his later years, Blaker regretted that he had not been blessed with a single-mindedness of vision that could have enabled him to succeed in his calling as artist. On 25 February 1932, he recorded in his journal:

The cause of my failure to "make good" in any single branch of knowledge is that I have too many interests. Had I been isolated in my youth at a time when there was demand for artistic expression, I should have been an artist of repute. I was dumped into a generation which did not care a damn for art – apart from popular art. I just happened. I was an Old Master, born centuries late. No kid ever had greater equipment. No kid ever faced greater frustration. Centuries ago I would have been apprenticed to a painter – as a boy well fitted to make good in a prosperous trade. Instead, at that period of my development, I was the veritable curse of damn-fool schoolmasters at my "public school", Cranleigh. I was a wondrous fair kid, strong, and good at games. I got something out of them. In the gym I builded up a body as strong and fair as that of any sweet boy of the 80s.

== Hugh Blaker and the Isleworth Mona Lisa ==
Shortly before World War I, Hugh Blaker discovered a painting of the Mona Lisa which had been sold from Montacute House in 1911 where it had been since 1858. This discovery led to the conjecture that Leonardo painted two portraits of Lisa del Giocondo: the famous one in The Louvre, and the one discovered by Blaker, who bought the painting and took it to his studio in Isleworth, London, from which it takes its name. According to Encyclopedia Americana and The New York Times, The Isleworth Mona Lisa has been attributed to Leonardo, and is thought to be the unfinished portrait from which Raphael made his famous sketch (which is in the Louvre museum); art historian Paul George Konody wrote of the painting that it "in no sense of the word a 'copy', but varies in some very important points from the Paris 'Mona Lisa'".
