= Paul George Konody =

Hungarian art critic and historian

- Portrait by William Roberts, 1920
- Born: 30 July 1872; Budapest
- Died: 30 November 1933 (aged 61)
- Occupation: Art critic

Paul George Konody (30 July 1872 – 30 November 1933) was a Hungarian-born, London-based art critic and historian, who wrote for several London newspapers, as well as writing numerous books and articles on noted artists and collections, with a focus on the Renaissance. A recognized expert on the art of the Renaissance, he was lauded for his evaluation of claims of authenticity for works from that period, correctly debunking Wilhelm von Bode's assertion that a bust of Flora was sculpted by Leonardo da Vinci. During World War I, Konody became interested in the representation of war in the arts, and directed an effort to commemorate Canadian participation in that war.

== Early life ==
Konody was born in Budapest, Hungary, in 1872. He received his education in Vienna, and in 1889 emigrated to the United Kingdom, settling in London.

== Career ==
=== Early writing and opinions ===
Konody was the art critic for The Daily Mail and The Observer, writing for the latter until his death. He was also the editor of The Artist from 1900 to 1902, and wrote numerous articles for the Encyclopædia Britannica and the Dictionary of National Biography. He was a master of the Junior Art Worker's Guild from 1903 to 1904. He wrote volumes on Walter Crane and Diego Velázquez in 1902 and 1903, respectively, and described the works of Filippino Lippi for a 1905 volume published by the Newnes's Art Library, writing of Lippi that "some of his qualities show him to be the most subtle psychologist of his time, the most modern in spirit of all the artists of the Renaissance". In 1908, Konody published a volume on Raphael for the a series of "The Masterpieces in Color" for the publishing company of Frederick A. Stokes.

In 1910, Konody notably dismissed some of the paintings of Vincent van Gogh as "merely the ravings of a maniac". That same year, Konody disputed the claims of German art historian Wilhelm von Bode that a bust of Flora acquired by Bode's Kaiser Friedrich Museum in Berlin was an original work of Leonardo da Vinci. Konody "waged war on Dr. Bode's claims through the columns of the London Daily Mail". Konody's evaluation was proven correct, as it was later exposed that the sculpture was likely created by English sculptor Richard Cockle Lucas, centuries after the time of Leonardo.

Konody's 1911 book, The Louvre, with Maurice W. Brockwell, was well-reviewed in The Guardian, which found it to be "a large and substantial volume" with "scholarly and well balanced" accounts of the painters.

=== Response to Futurism and evaluation of the Isleworth Mona Lisa ===
Konody was not so well-disposed towards certain artistic trends of his own time, joining other critics in dismissing Post-Impressionism and Futurism, describing some works of Cubism as "unintelligible", and referring to a 1912 showing of Futurist works as a "nightmare exhibition". He similarly objected to a growing trend inspired by Post-impressionism of decorating children's nursery rooms with colorful designs, which he suggested would "delight the infant who can scribble on the wall in perfect harmony with the design", but which adults would find distracting, and eventually boring. In 1914, Konody was one of a handful of critics who received "BLESSes" from the Vorticist literary magazine, Blast, asserted to be for supporting the magazine and other recent developments in art. The honor was ironic, given that Konody, along with J. C. Squire, were noted to have been more hostile than favorable to Blast, with Konody describing it as "a strange mixture of seriousness and facetiousness, common sense and absurdity". Konody was, however, impressed with the Futurist wartime painting, The First Searchlights at Charing Cross by C. R. W. Nevinson.

Towards the beginning of 1914, Konody examined the recently rediscovered Isleworth Mona Lisa, and concluded that, unlike Bode's bust of Flora, it was in fact by Leonardo da Vinci. The painting had been proposed by its owner, art collector Hugh Blaker, to have been painted by Leonardo, perhaps prior to the painting of the Mona Lisa in the Louvre. Konody wrote that the reception of the painting had been marred by "some press agent who sent out the news broadcast, with wrong statements, misquotations, and other blunders galore", but nonetheless found that "though not altogether from the hand of Leonardo da Vinci himself, it emanates most certainly from his studio and was very largely worked up by the master himself". Konody further stated of the painting that "[t]he hands, with their careful and somewhat hard drawing and terra cotta coloring, suggest at once the name of Leonardo's pupil, Marco d' Oggionno; whereas the inimitably soft and lovely painting of the head and bust, the exquisite subtlety of the expression, the golden glow of the general coloring, can be due only to Leonardo". Konody found the painting to have features "far more pleasing and beautiful than in the Louvre version". Blaker's father in law, John R. Eyre, wrote in a monograph defending the authenticity of the Isleworth Mona Lisa, "when this opinion was endorsed by an art critic of Mr. P. G. Konody's standing, I felt convinced there was at least good ground for investigation".

=== World War I and interest in the art of wartime ===
In 1915, Konody "was commissioned to make a critical inventory of all the works of art in the national repositories of Constantinople", but this project was cancelled due to the escalation of World War I. In 1917, Konody was appointed honorary secretary and art director of a committee to commemorate Canadian participation in that war. For this purpose, he participated in selecting artists to be commissioned to travel to the war zone and to prepare works recording the battles, ranging from etchings and portraits to colossal paintings, with the works later being displayed in venues such as the Anderson Galleries in New York City. Years after his death, Konody was praised for being "able to get the committee to accept so many radical paintings, for instance those of Paul Nash, Wyndham Lewis and the then unknown David Milne", though it was also asserted that Konody initially "ignored Canadian artists in favor of Europeans to memorialize the Canadian effort". During and after the war, Konody developed a general interest in artwork depicting wartime, publishing a noted article, On War Memorials in 1919.

In 1919, the New York Herald described Konody, then visiting the United States while directing the Canadian War Memorial Exhibition, as "[o]ne of the men best qualified to speak" on the authenticity of several contested paintings then being disputed which were claimed to have been produced during the Renaissance. For several years later in his life, Konody was honorary secretary of a committee that oversaw the British pavilion at the annual International Art Exhibition in Venice (now the Venice Biennale).

== Personal life and death ==
He was born Paul Georg Konody to Maxmilian Alexander Konody and his wife Aloisia Olga Alexander. In October 1901, Konody married watercolor painter Isabel Codrington. The couple had two daughters during the following five years. They lived in London and enjoyed a social scene that featured many artists, poets and writers. They divorced in 1912, and Codrington later married art dealer Gustavus Mayer. One of Konody's daughters, Pauline Konody, had some success as a watercolor painter as well. Konody was noted to have been a practicing Catholic.

Konody died in November 1933, following a lengthy illness and an operation. In October of the following year, the Bethnal Green Museum honored Konody with the establishment of the Paul Konody Memorial Library, to include Konody's substantial collection of "more than 2,000 volumes, dealing principally with his special subjects, painting, architecture, sculpture, and the history of art, particularly of the fine arts".

== Selected publications ==
- The Art of Walter Crane. 1902.
- Velasquez, Life and Work. 1903.
- Filippino Lippi. 1903.
- The Brothers Van Eyck. 1907.
- Raphael. Jack, 1908.
- Chardin. Jack, 1909.
- Delacroix. Jack, 1910.
- Through the Alps to the Apennines. Kegan Paul, Trench, Trubner, London, 1911.
- Filippo Lippi. 1911.
- The Louvre. Jack, 1911.
- On War Memorials. 1919.
- Italian painting. Jack, 1929. (With R. H. Wilenski)
- An introduction to French painting. Cassell, London, 1932. (With Xenia Lathom)
- Sir William Orpen. Seeley Service, 1932. (With Sidney Dark)
