= Isleworth Mona Lisa =

Copy or earlier version of the Mona Lisa

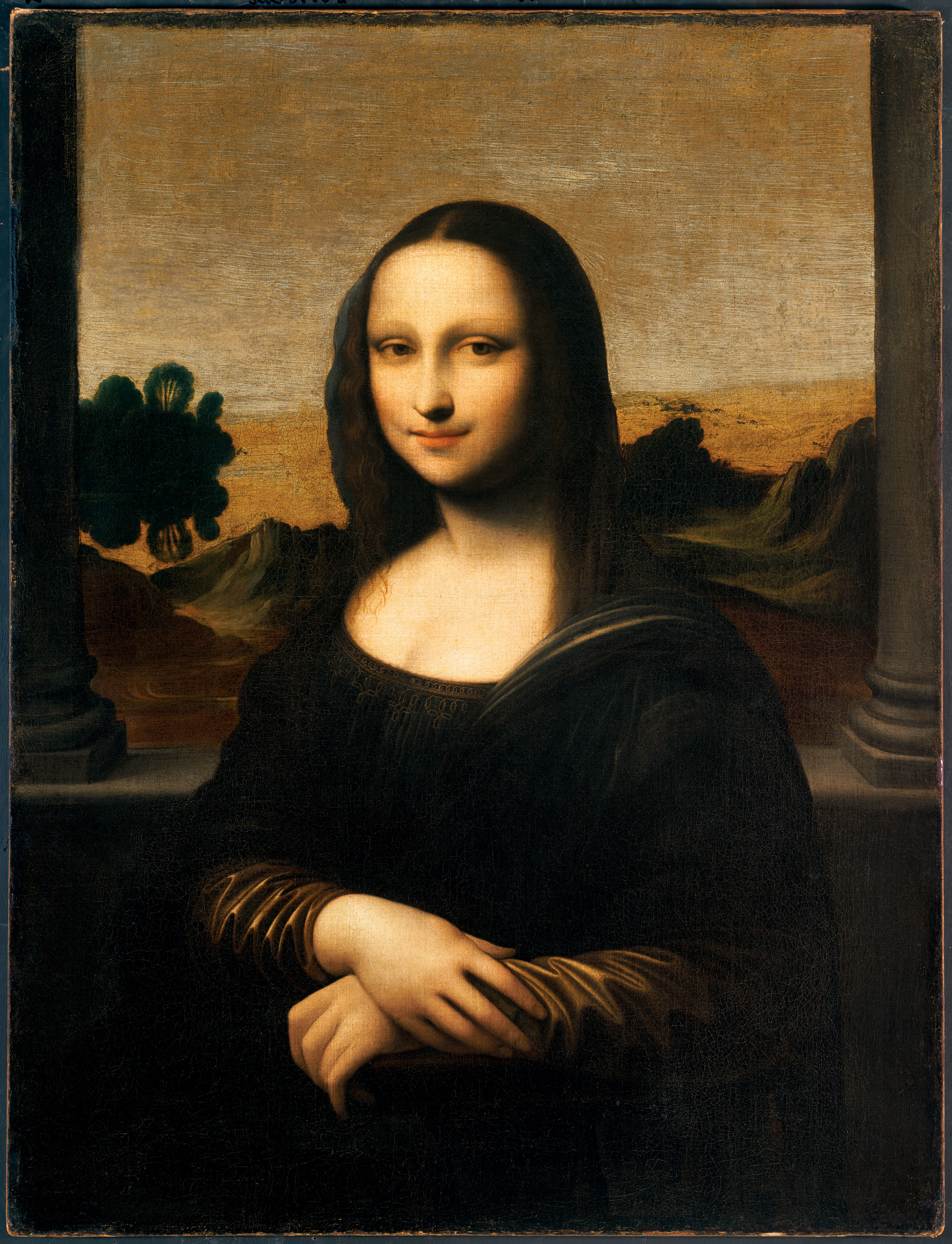
- Year: Early sixteenth-century
- Medium: Oil on canvas
- Subject: Lisa Gherardini
- Dimensions: 84.5 cm × 64.5 cm (33.3 in × 25.4 in)
- Location: Private collection, Switzerland

The Isleworth Mona Lisa is an early 16th-century oil on canvas painting depicting the same subject as Leonardo da Vinci's Mona Lisa, though with the subject (Lisa del Giocondo) depicted as being a younger age. The painting is thought to have been brought from Italy to England in the 1780s, and came into public view in 1913 when the English connoisseur Hugh Blaker acquired it shortly after it had been sold from Montacute House, where it was thought to have been hanging for over a century. The painting would eventually adopt its unofficial name of Isleworth Mona Lisa from Blaker's studio being in Isleworth, West London. Since the 1910s, experts in various fields, as well as the collectors who have acquired ownership of the painting, have asserted that the major elements of the painting are the work of Leonardo himself, as an earlier version of the Mona Lisa.

In 1914, art critic Paul George Konody criticized early reports of the painting, which contained errors that he believed caused skepticism about the painting to become "hostile incredulity", but Konody nonetheless found that the painting was clearly "very largely worked up by the master himself". Konody also found the painting to have features "far more pleasing and beautiful than in the Louvre version". A number of Italian experts in the 1920s echoed Konody's assessment of authorship by Leonardo at a time when the painting was more broadly examined. Much later authorities have made varying characterizations of the degree to which the painting can be ascribed to Leonardo; in 2012, The Guardian described the art world as being "split" over the question, and in 2013, Reuters said that it was "dismissed by some experts", but "also won support in the art world". Art historian Jean-Pierre Isbouts has endorsed Leonardo's involvement in painting the work, asserting that "24 of 27 recognised Leonardo scholars have agreed this is a Leonardo", while art historian Martin Kemp dismisses the proposition that Leonardo painted any part, and in 2012 described his contemporaries in the art world as being equivocal, or making "encouraging but noncommittal statements" on this point.

Kemp and others who doubt Leonardo's hand in the painting attribute it to the Leonardeschi, Leonardo's workshop, believing it to be one of a number of copies of the Mona Lisa produced by Leonardo's collaborators, assistants, and pupils, though, as Leonardo biographer Walter Isaacson expressed it, "perhaps with an occasional helping hand from the master". In 2010, The Mona Lisa Foundation was founded to investigate if the Isleworth Mona Lisa was painted in part by Leonardo, but as an earlier version of the Louvre Mona Lisa.

Differing views have been expressed on the relative weight to be given to scientific evidence versus connoisseurship. Physicist John F. Asmus, who pioneered laser-restoration techniques for Renaissance art, and who had previously examined the Mona Lisa in the Louvre for this purpose, published a computer image processing study in 1988 concluding that the brush strokes of the face in the painting were performed by the same artist responsible for the brush strokes of the face of the Mona Lisa in the Louvre, and replicated that finding in a 2016 study. However, curator Luke Syson has argued that science is "only ever one of several factors we'd use to assess the authenticity and authorship of a work of art". An independent 2015 academic journal article also attributed the work to Leonardo on stylistic grounds.

== Description ==
The Mona Lisa (1503–1516) by Leonardo da Vinci

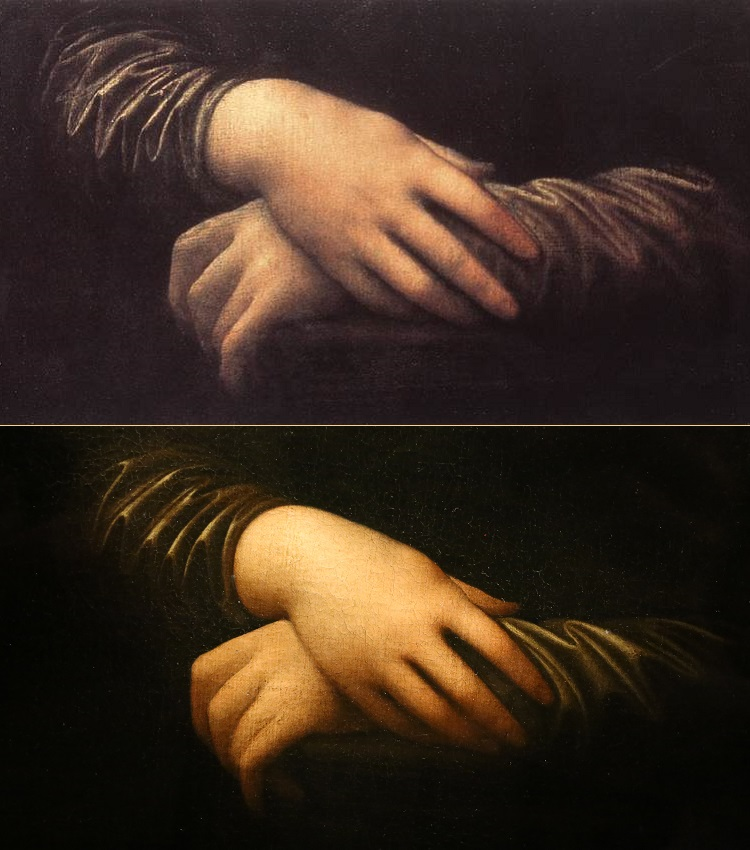
Hands of the Louvre Mona Lisa (top) and the Isleworth Mona Lisa (bottom)

The Isleworth Mona Lisa is of the same subject as the Mona Lisa in the Louvre and there are many similarities between the two. Both paintings depict a dark-haired woman, Lisa Gherardini, who sits at an angle and is surrounded by the landscape behind her. The work measures 84.5 × 64.5 cm, slightly larger than the Louvre Mona Lisa. However, the Isleworth Mona Lisa is differentiated by the model being noticeably younger, having columns, and being painted on canvas. The canvas is of hand-woven linen cloth, characterized by "simple 'tabby' weaves with an average count of 18 threads per cm^{2} in the warp and 16 threads per cm^{2} in the weft, that cross one another regularly, with some variation in thickness. The result is a deformation in which the warp is slightly tighter than the weft".

=== Face and hands ===
Konody observed of the Isleworth subject that "[t]he head is inclined at a different angle". Physicist John F. Asmus, who had previously examined the Mona Lisa in the Louvre and investigated other works by Leonardo, published a computer image processing study in 1988 concluding that the brush strokes of the face in the painting were performed by the same artist responsible for the brush strokes of the face of the Mona Lisa in the Louvre. Asmus found that the head appears to be "tilted forward toward the viewer ... consistent with the dramatically shorter appearing neck, which is also a greater angle to the vertical than that of the Louvre painting". Another early reviewer commented that "[t]he head is tilted more forward and the parting of the hair is exactly in the center, while that of the Louvre picture starts in the middle of the forehead and runs towards the back of the head at an impossible and incorrect angle". Asmus observed that "the Isleworth figure has a somewhat higher forehead, a slightly wider face, and less of a bulge in the veil over the proper left side of the head". He further reported that "the eyes are much wider set in the Isleworth painting". John Eyre reported Adolfo Venturi, in his early 1920s examination, praised "the beauty of the eye drawing ... is the principal portion done by Leonardo together with the line of the mouth".

A review of the painting in the Deseret News shortly after it was first shown to the public describes its tonality as being darker, and describes the coloring as being in "accordance with almost all the works attributed to Leonardo—that of a golden glow—while the finish is of a most minute character". Italian curator Lorenzo Cecconi, who also examined the painting in the 1920s, said that "the fusion of the tints of the flesh, especially in the eyes; the line which designs the nose, the mouth, and the oval of the face" were remarkable, and indicated that "this may be a second work of the Great Leonardo". In the same period, Renaissance scholar Arduino Colasanti thought "the upper part with the eyes and nose of the face" were definitely by Leonardo, and noted collector Ludovico Spiridon stated that "the face has been painted by Leonardo; no doubt of this at all". In the 1960s, the art dealer Henry F. Pulitzer argued that "densitometric tests on the planes of face and hands show a gradual change of tone values from dark to light which only [Leonardo] da Vinci, with his amazing eyesight, was capable of". Asmus similarly found in the 1980s that amplitude histograms sorting the number of pixels of each brightness level in these features "reveal a remarkable similarity even though the images are noticeably different". Other differences have been observed with respect to aspects of the face:

The Louvre picture, whether from cleaning or some other cause, shows a bulge over the left eye which is anatomically impossible—a blemish which is absent in the newly discovered version, while the line of the jaw is not cut in so suddenly against the chin. ... the whole picture is unbelievably beautiful.

French artist Albert Sauteur suggested in 2014 that differences between the paintings were accounted for not only by the model having aged, but that the narrower face and closer eyes in the Louvre painting could be accounted for by Leonardo experimenting with painting from a binocular visual perspective, rather than the traditional monocular perspective. British fine arts consultant Archibald Cecil Chappelow of the Royal Society of Arts, wrote in 1956 that "the face is superbly painted, and the hands more neatly defined than those in the Louvre painting". Asmus specifically asserted that "portions of the hands in the Louvre painting have been criticized as being 'fat and ugly'", while "it is intriguing to note that the Isleworth thumb is more slender and closer to what would be expected from Leonardo". Asmus notes that this may be the result of inept repair work later on. Konody further stated of the painting that "[t]he hands, with their careful and somewhat hard drawing and terra cotta coloring, suggest at once the name of Leonardo's pupil, Marco d' Oggionno; whereas the inimitably soft and lovely painting of the head and bust, the exquisite subtlety of the expression, the golden glow of the general coloring, can be due only to Leonardo". Spiridon thought that "[t]he redness of the hands is probably due to a bad varnish that could be removed". Konody found the features of the Isleworth painting overall to be "more delicate" than those of the Louvre painting, stating of them, "let it be boldly stated, far more pleasing and beautiful than in the Louvre version".

Art critic Jonathan Jones expressed himself decisively against the attribution of the painting to Leonardo, above all, but not only, in consideration of the features of the face.

=== Hair and body ===
The Detroit Free Press reported in 1914 that "[t]he hair which falls over the left shoulder is hardly indicated against the left breast, thus differing from the Louvre picture". Cecconi observed that "the locks of hair falling on the right shoulder" did not correspond exactly to those in the Louvre's Mona Lisa, and that "the border around the neck differs in small details". Colasanti, in his evaluation, was "particularly strong on the question of the hair", which he thought was indeed by Leonardo. Kemp particularly dismissed the hair and clothing, describing the hair in the Louvre painting as having a "characteristic rivulet pattern", while deeming the rendering in the Isleworth version "routine".

With respect to other elements of the body, Colasanti "was inclined to think that Melzi had done a great part of it", noting in particular that the throat "did not give the idea of being able to turn round which was extremely noticeable in all throats painted by Leonardo". Spiridon also thought the throat to have definitely been painted by someone other than Leonardo.

Kemp considered certain elements of the clothing to be lacking, particularly in the rendering of the veil, while professors Salvatore Lorusso and Andrea Natali of the University of Bologna, examining multiple portraits sharing the theme of the Mona Lisa, write of the Isleworth painting that "additional impressive features are found that can only be attributed to the hand of a great master", including "details in the rendering and design of the embroidery on the dress, which suggest a brilliant mind".

=== Background and columns ===
It is generally agreed that the painting was originally left unfinished, and specifically that the parts of the background other than the columns were a later addition. In Colasanti's evaluation, for example, "[t]he background did not worry him, it was not Leonardo". According to Pulitzer, testing of the paint indicated that the columns were part of the original work, while the background was "added in the 17th century in paints of a type used by Flemish artists", though Isbouts writes that "[s]everal tests have been made on the pigments, all confirming that the pigment components were all existing and available at the turn of the 16th century". Both Eyre and Pulitzer said in their defenses of the painting that the columns were similar to those included by Raphael in his 1503 sketch of Leonardo's painting, although not found in the Louvre Mona Lisa. Kemp is particularly critical of the background, finding it monotonous, and the island of trees on the far left and their reflection poorly executed. Konody, however, wrote of the painting, that there "is far more background", and therefore felt that "the spacing is infinitely more pleasing", and that the background was "far less assertive than in the Paris picture".

In examining the portraits through computer image processing technology, Asmus inserted the Isleworth painting subject on the Louvre painting background, so as to analyze the two subjects in the same context.

== Background ==
=== Origin ===
It is generally agreed that the Isleworth Mona Lisa was painted in the early sixteenth century. Those who believe that Leonardo painted it contend that disparate dates proposed for the initiation of the Mona Lisa indicate that two different paintings were worked on at different times, with the Isleworth Mona Lisa being begun in 1503 and left unfinished, and the Louvre Mona Lisa being begun after 1513. Specifically, it is believed by some that Leonardo da Vinci had begun working on a portrait of Lisa del Giocondo, the model of the Mona Lisa, in Florence by October 1503. Although the Louvre states that it was "doubtless painted between 1503 and 1506", Eugène Müntz is known to have reported that by 1501 Fra. Pietro de Nuvolaria had written in a letter that "two of Leonardo's pupils were painting portraits which he occasionally worked upon himself", suggested as possibly referring to versions of the Mona Lisa. Kemp notes difficulties in confirming the dates with certainty. In addition, many Leonardo experts, such as Carlo Pedretti and Alessandro Vezzosi, are of the opinion that the Louvre painting is characteristic of Leonardo's style in the final years of his life, post-1513. Other academics argue that, given the historical documentation, Leonardo would have painted the work from 1513. Proponents of the Isleworth point to the account of sixteenth-century biographer Giorgio Vasari, who wrote of the Mona Lisa that "after he had lingered over it four years, [he] left it unfinished". The record of an October 1517 visit by Luigi d'Aragon states that the Mona Lisa was executed for Giuliano de' Medici, Leonardo's patron at the Belvedere Palace between 1513 and 1516 (Note: "... Messer Lunardo Vinci [sic] ... showed His Excellency three pictures, one of a certain Florentine lady done from life at the instance of the late Magnificent, Giuliano de' Medici".)—though this has been suspected an error. (Note: "Possibly it was another portrait of which no record and no copies exist—Giuliano de' Medici surely had nothing to do with the Mona Lisa—the probability is that the secretary, overwhelmed as he must have been at the time, inadvertently dropped the Medici name in the wrong place".) According to Vasari, the painting was created for the model's husband, Francesco del Giocondo.

It has been asserted that Leonardo "almost invariably commenced two versions of each of his works, which he rarely finished". A number of experts have argued that Leonardo made two versions of the Mona Lisa (because of the uncertainty concerning its dating and commissioner, as well as its fate following Leonardo's death in 1519, and the difference of details in Raphael's sketch—which may reflect that he made the sketch from memory). Experts universally agree that Raphael's pen-and-ink sketch, in which the columns flanking the subject are more apparent, is based on Leonardo's portrait. Other later copies of the Mona Lisa, such as those in the National Museum of Art, Architecture and Design and The Walters Art Museum, also display large flanking columns. As a result, it was thought that the Mona Lisa had been trimmed. However, by 1993, Frank Zöllner observed that the painting surface had never been trimmed; this was confirmed through a series of tests in 2004. In view of this, Vincent Delieuvin, curator of 16th-century Italian painting at the Louvre, states that the sketch and these other copies must have been inspired by another version, while Zöllner states that the sketch may be after another Leonardo portrait of the same subject.

Dianne Hales wrote that painter and art theorist Gian Paolo Lomazzo also seems to identify two versions of the painting: "Lomazzo, a supposed acquaintance of Leonardo's longtime secretary Melzi, wrote that 'the two most beautiful and important portraits by Leonardo are the Mona Lisa and the Gioconda'". The hypothetical first portrait, displaying prominent columns, would have been commissioned by Giocondo circa 1503, and left unfinished in Leonardo's pupil and assistant Salaì's possession until his death in 1524. The second, commissioned by Giuliano de' Medici circa 1513, would have been sold by Salaì to Francis I in 1518 (Note: Along with The Virgin and Child with St. Anne and St. John the Baptist) and is the one in the Louvre today. Those who believe that there was only one true Mona Lisa have been unable to agree between the two aforementioned fates.

=== Post-rediscovery history ===
Researchers have indicated that the Isleworth painting was likely brought to England from Italy in the 1780s by a Somerset nobleman named James Marwood, who was documented as owning a painting attributed to Leonardo and titled La Jaconde (the French title of the Mona Lisa). A record of holdings of the Avishays Estate in Chard, also mentioning Marwood, includes an 1858 entry for "[c]atalogues of plate and china, and of furniture etc. including picture of La Joconda". In 1913, English connoisseur and art collector Hugh Blaker spotted and acquired the painting shortly after it had been sold from Montacute House, where it had been hanging for over half a century. The painting would eventually adopt its unofficial name of Isleworth Mona Lisa from Blaker's studio being in Isleworth, West London. In a letter he wrote to his sister Jane, Blaker stated that he thought the work to be by Leonardo and therefore saw potential for making money out of his purchase.

Towards the beginning of 1914, Hungarian-born London art critic and historian Paul George Konody examined the painting, and concluded that, unlike Wilhelm von Bode's bust of Flora (which Konody had correctly discerned was falsely claimed as Leonardo), the painting was in fact by Leonardo. Konody wrote that the reception of the painting had been marred by "some press agent who sent out the news broadcast, with wrong statements, misquotations, and other blunders galore", but nonetheless found that "though not altogether from the hand of Leonardo da Vinci himself, it emanates most certainly from his studio and was very largely worked up by the master himself". Blaker's step-father, John R. Eyre, published a monograph in 1915 that suggested a partial attribution to Leonardo. Eyre cited Konody's evaluation defending the authenticity of the Isleworth Mona Lisa as the motivation for his monograph, "when this opinion was endorsed by an art critic of Mr. P. G. Konody's standing, I felt convinced there was at least good ground for investigation". In this monograph Eyre was the first to formally propose the painting as an earlier version of the Mona Lisa at the Louvre. Kemp notes of Eyre that "His little book of fifty-one pages is full of careful scholarship, and makes about as good a case as can be made".

With the approach of World War I, Blaker sent the painting to the Boston Museum of Fine Arts for safekeeping. Blaker's step-father, John Eyre, also believed in its attribution and argued that the painting was an earlier version of Leonardo's Mona Lisa at the Louvre. In 1922, Eyre traveled throughout Italy consulting various scholars on the painting, who generally concluded that Leonardo painted the most significant parts of the work. Eyre reported these endorsements in a 1923 publication, which also expanded on the thesis of his 1915 book. Eyre's 1923 book contained "opinions from some of the foremost art experts in Italy after the turn of the century", including Lorenzo Cecconi, Arduino Colasanti, and Adolfo Venturi, and those experts generally "agreed the painting probably was done in Da Vinci's studio, by his students, if not by himself". According to journalist Dianne Hales, however the attributions based on connoisseurship evaluating sections of the painting such as face, hair, hands, and background failed to win a consensus as to authenticity at that time. In 1936, the work was shown at the Leicester Galleries in London, where it was seen by Henry F. Pulitzer, who was immediately struck by it. After Blaker's death later in 1936, the painting was passed to his sister, Jane, who died in 1947, which left the painting's whereabouts unknown for a time.

Pulitzer acquired the painting in 1962, and thereafter took the attribution further than Eyre, arguing that it was Leonardo's only real portrait of Lisa Gherardini, implying the Louvre Mona Lisa to be a copy. Hales wrote that "Pulitzer had to sell his grand house in Kensington, all of its furnishings, and many of its paintings ... Although the art world never overcame its skepticism, Pulitzer remained a believer to the end". Pulitzer's argument included much historical evidence, including Vasari's controversial account. In 1963, Pulitzer exhibited the painting in Phoenix, Arizona, inviting "all experts and critics who wish to view the painting and his evidence". Jean-Pierre Isbouts notes of Pulitzer that despite his success as a publisher he was "not a very talented author", concluding that "[h]is unfortunate 1966 book about the painting, filled with uppercase screeds ... did far more harm than good, and ensured that no self-respecting art historian would go near the work".

When Pulitzer died in 1979, his partner, Elizabeth Meyer, inherited the painting and after her death in 2008, the Isleworth Mona Lisa was sold to a group of Geneva-based investors. On 27 September 2012, The Mona Lisa Foundation of Zurich officially unveiled the painting and simultaneously presented the Foundation's research and arguments for the painting's authenticity. Several leading modern scholars have continued to express skepticism. In 2012, The Guardian described the art world as being "split" over the question, and in 2013, Reuters reported that it was "dismissed by some experts", but "also won support in the art world". In 2019, an anonymous "distinguished European family" claimed that the painting's former owner had sold them a 25% stake in the painting, but a lawyer speaking for current owners stated that the claim was clearly without merit.

== Attribution ==
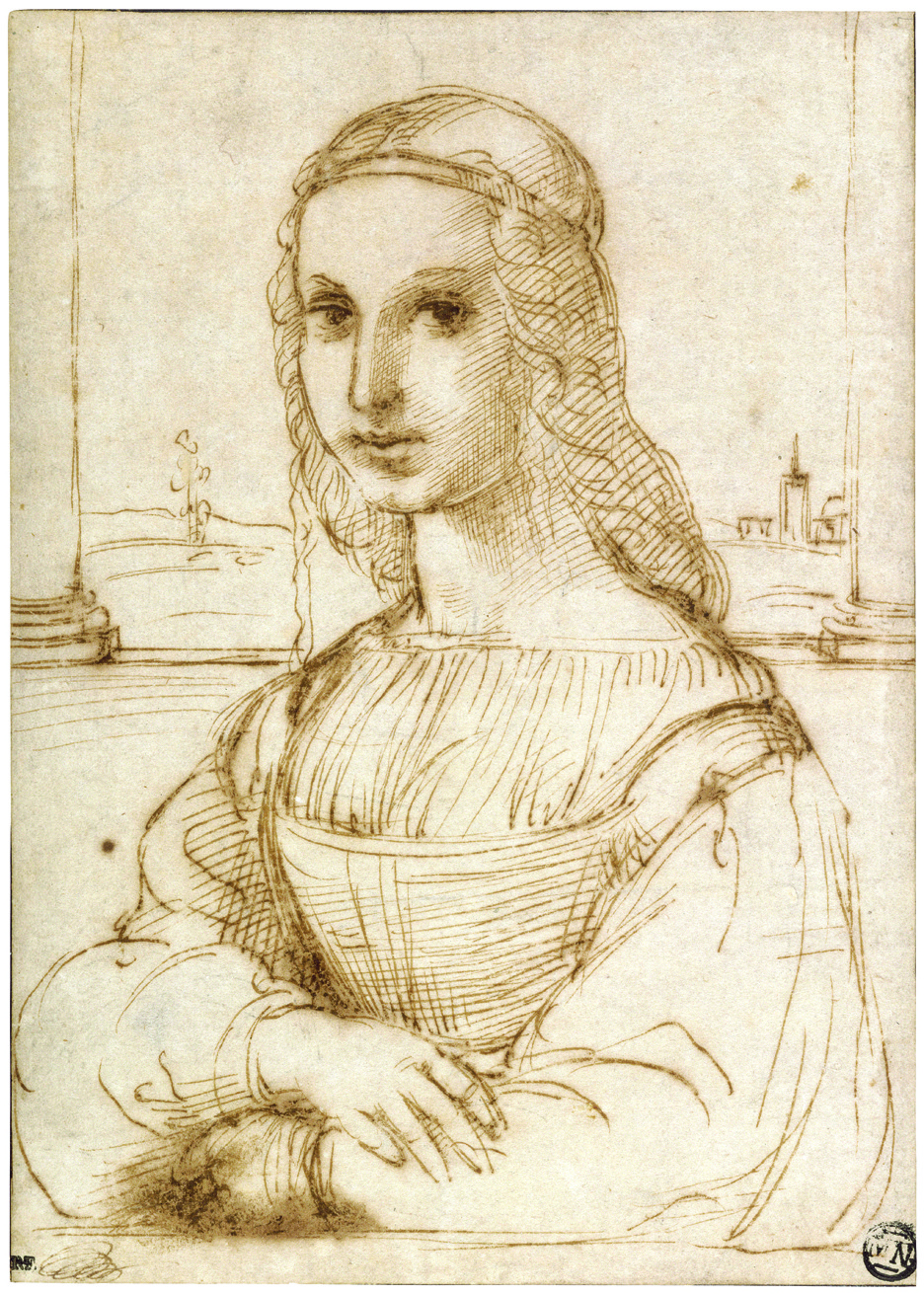
Young Woman on a Balcony by Raphael (c. 1505), after Leonardo; today in the Louvre

It is generally agreed that the Isleworth Mona Lisa was painted during Leonardo's lifetime and in his studio, the question being whether Leonardo himself painted any substantial portion of the painting. A number of arguments have been made for and against this proposition. Sources have suggested that Leonardo occasionally worked on paintings being prepared by others in his studio, for example in Fra. Pietro de Nuvolaria's 1501 letter stating that "two of Leonardo's pupils were painting portraits which he occasionally worked upon himself", and Isaacson's assertion that students painting in Leonardo's studio may have received "an occasional helping hand from the master". Konody wrote in his evaluation of the Isleworth Mona Lisa that "it is worth noting that the painting of two versions of the same subject would not be an isolated instance in the practice of Leonardo—witness the 'Virgin of the Rocks', of which both the Louvre and the National Gallery in London own authentic versions".

=== Initial examinations ===
Documentary attribution of the painting to Leonardo reportedly traces to its ownership by James Marwood in the 1780s. After its rediscovery in 1913 this attribution to was again suggested by its owner, Hugh Blaker, who believed it to be by Leonardo. Konody, after his own examination of the painting, wrote in The New York Times that the discovery of the painting had been marred by attendant publicity, stating that "skepticism turns into hostile incredulity, if the discovery is injudiciously exploited by some press agent who sent out the news broadcast, with wrong statements, misquotations, and other blunders galore", but nonetheless finding that "though not altogether from the hand of Leonardo da Vinci himself, it emanates most certainly from his studio and was very largely worked up by the master himself". Although Konody saw the styles of other artists in parts of the painting, he wrote that "the inimitably soft and lovely painting of the head and bust, the exquisite subtlety of the expression, the golden glow of the general coloring, can be due only to Leonardo".

Blaker's stepfather, John Eyre, expanded on Blaker's theory in his 1915 publication, arguing that it was the earlier version of the better known Louvre Mona Lisa. Eyre published another book in 1923, which was the result of consultation with 10 experts, many of whom attributed sections of the painting to Leonardo. Art historian Martin Kemp notes that "His little book of fifty-one pages is full of careful scholarship, and makes about as good a case as can be made". However, Blaker and Eyre's efforts did not result in wide acceptance.

=== 20th century testing by Pulitzer and Asmus ===
When Henry Pulitzer purchased the painting in 1962, he immediately endorsed the attribution of Eyre, stating the Isleworth was the only Mona Lisa done by Leonardo. This was an observation repeated in his book where he argued that Leonardo's contemporary Raphael made a sketch of this painting, probably from memory, after seeing it in Leonardo's studio in 1504. The Raphael sketch includes the two Greek columns that are not found in the Louvre's Mona Lisa, but are found in the Isleworth painting. Pulitzer presents a few pages of art expert testimonials in his book; some of these experts seemed to believe that Leonardo was the painter, others felt the artist was somebody who worked in Leonardo's studio, and still others suggested that other artists may have done it. He then presents laboratory evidence, such as light to dark ratios across the canvas and X-rays, that suggested the painting to be by Leonardo. However, specific detail on the manner in which these studies were carried out, and by whom, is not provided. He wrote: "I have no intention of cluttering up this book with too many technicalities and wish to make this chapter brief". No independent reports on the painting are cited in his text; he uses the pronoun "we" to refer to the team that conducted the research. As his own Pulitzer Press then published these results, there is a lack of outside corroboration for his assertions.

In the late 1980s, physicist John F. Asmus used computer image processing to examine the Louvre Mona Lisa to determine how the colors would appear if they were not distorted by the yellowing of the aged varnish, and discovered previously unknown evidence that the subject had originally been painted with a necklace, which had apparently then been painted over and thereby removed, by Leonardo. In 1988, Asmus published his results from using this technology to compare the faces of Isleworth Mona Lisa and the Louvre Mona Lisa, finding that they shared a signature frequency of degrees of lightness and darkness, which Asmus concluded indicated that this aspect of both paintings was painted by the same person.

=== 21st century examinations ===
Between 2012 and 2013, experts examined and studied the work. Kemp wrote that at a 2012 conference, art historians and Leonardo experts Alessandro Vezzosi and Carlo Pedretti "made encouraging but noncommittal statements about the picture being of high quality and worthy of further research". A summary of examinations and tests that were carried out was reported by Reuters on 13 February 2013. Alfonso Rubino, who had previously studied Leonardo's Vitruvian Man, "demonstrated that the geometric principles that Leonardo adopted in his Vitruvian Man are also found in both the Louvre Mona Lisa and in the Isleworth painting", and therefore concluded the Isleworth to be by Leonardo's hand. In 2013, Professor Atila Soares examined the painting in detail and published a book where he confirmed its authenticity as a genuine Leonardo.

In October 2013, Jean-Pierre Isbouts published his book The Mona Lisa Myth examining the history and events behind the Louvre and Isleworth paintings and confirmed the latter's attribution to Leonardo. A companion film of the same name was released in March 2014. In April 2014, Albert Sauteur examined the perspective used to execute the Isleworth Mona Lisa and the Mona Lisa in the Louvre, and concluded that Leonardo painted both works, modifying his technique for the second. In July 2014, The Mona Lisa Mystery premiered on the PBS television station's series Secrets of the Dead. This documentary investigated, at length, the authenticity of the Isleworth painting. In support of his assertion of authorship, Isbouts pointed to the similarities of the Raphael drawing and the work done by Asmus, as well as confirmation by other examiners that the canvas and paints were the appropriate age, and that the painting exhibited "downward-extending brush strokes from left to right ... consistent with the work of a left-handed artist", as Leonardo was.

In 2015, an academic publication by professors Salvatore Lorusso and Andrea Natali provided an extensive analysis of Mona Lisa paintings and copies, and concluded that the Isleworth Mona Lisa was an original work by Leonardo, on stylistic grounds. In 2016, Asmus revisited the painting with professors Vadim Parfenov and Jessie Elford, with the trio publishing the results of scientific examinations that established to their satisfaction that the same artist painted the face of both the Mona Lisa and the Isleworth Mona Lisa. Gérard Boudin de l'Arche published a comprehensive historical account in 2017, wherein he stated that Leonardo painted the Isleworth Mona Lisa before the Louvre Mona Lisa.

=== Canvas ===
Kemp and others have observed that Leonardo's preferred medium was wood, asserting that he rarely painted on canvas. Others have countered that Leonardo "assiduously experimented with new ideas and technologies", and that "the artist did occasionally paint on canvas". In particular, Lorusso and Natali note that Leonardo had previous painted studies on drapery on a canvas that "had almost identical features", and that Leonardo's manuscript, A Treatise on Painting, "describes in detail not only how to prepare the canvas for painting, but also how to paint on it". Isbouts said that carbon dating of the canvas returned a result "consistent with a 1503-1506 execution date for the painting". Lorusso and Natali indicate that the canvas was prepared with a layer of reddish-brown material, "a combination of red-brown ochre calcite and some grains of quartz", and that this was a technique used by Leonardo in other paintings to give additional warmth to the final painting. Isbouts states that testing of the canvas underlying the painting "revealed a detailed underdrawing with revisions", which he asserts are indicative of an original work rather than a copy.

The Mona Lisa Foundation also responded to the use of canvas in the Isleworth Mona Lisa, citing the Benois Madonna (which is generally attributed to Leonardo) as a work Leonardo painted on canvas. However, author Jehane Ragai asserted that the Benois Madonna was originally painted on wood and then transferred to canvas. Besides the Benois Madonna, the only other generally accepted Leonardo paintings that use canvas, the Virgin of the Rocks (Louvre version) and The Madonna of the Yarnwinder (The Lansdowne Madonna), (Note: The Landsdowne Madonna is usually attributed to Leonardo and a student of his.) were also transferred from wood panels. It has also been noted, however, that Leonardo visited Venice in 1500, at a time when oil painting on canvas was quickly coming into vogue there, "being lighter and more manageable. Mounted on a stretcher it offered the brush a more congenial ground; being softer and more flexible, it offered textural and gestural possibilities ..." While in Venice, Leonardo may have been in contact with Giorgione, who was himself painting a significant work on canvas, The Judgement of Solomon, which in turn appears to be stylistically influenced by Leonardo.

== Exhibitions ==
In 2023, The Isleworth Mona Lisa went on display at the Promotrice delle Belle Arti in Turin, Italy. The exhibit, titled "The First Mona Lisa," ran through May 26, 2024.

== See also ==
- Speculations about Mona Lisa
- Two–Mona Lisa theory

== Sources ==
Books

- Asmus, John F. (1990) [1989]. "Computer Studies of the Isleworth and Louvre Mona Lisas". In Hsing, T. Russell; Tescher, Andrew G. (eds.). Selected Papers on Visual Communication: Technology and Applications. Bellingham, Washington: SPIE Optical Engineering Press. pp. 652–656. Reprinted from Optical Engineering, Vol. 28(7) (July 1989), pp. 800–804
- Eyre, John (1915). Monograph on Leonardo Da Vinci's ʻMona Lisaʻ. London: H. Grevel.
- Eyre, John (1923). The Two Mona Lisas: which was Giacondo's picture?: ten direct, distinct, and decisive data in favour of the Isleworth version, and some recent Italian expert opinions on it. London, England: J.M. Ouseley & Son. OCLC 19335669.
- Hales, Dianne (2017). Mona Lisa: A life discovered. New York City, New York: Simon & Schuster. ISBN 978-1451658972.
- Isaacson, Walter (2017). Leonardo da Vinci (1st ed.). New York City, New York: Simon & Schuster. ISBN 978-1501139154.
- Kemp, Martin (2006). Leonardo da Vinci: The Marvelous Works of Nature and Man. Oxford, England: Oxford University Press. ISBN 978-0-19-280725-0.
- Kemp, Martin (2018). Living with Leonardo: Fifty Years of Sanity and Insanity in the Art World and Beyond. London, England: Thames & Hudson. ISBN 978-0500774236.
- Marani, Pietro C. (2003). Leonardo da Vinci: The Complete Paintings (1st ed.). New York City, New York: Harry N. Abrams. ISBN 978-0810935815.
- Pulitzer, Henry E. (1960). Where is the Mona Lisa?. London, England: The Pulitzer Press. ASIN B0027MR0A2.
- Ragai, Jehane (2015). Scientist And The Forger, The: Insights Into The Scientific Detection Of Forgery In Paintings. Singapore: World Scientific. ISBN 978-1783267422.
- Syson, Luke; Larry Keith; Arturo Galansino; Antoni Mazzotta; Scott Nethersole; Per Rumberg (2011). Leonardo da Vinci: Painter at the Court of Milan (1st ed.). London, England: National Gallery. ISBN 978-1857094916.
- Zöllner, Frank (2019). Leonardo da Vinci: The Complete Paintings and Drawings (Anniversary ed.). Cologne, Germany: Taschen.

Academic Journals

- Lorusso, Salvatore; Natali, Andrea (January 2015). "Mona Lisa: A Comparative Evaluation of the Different Versions and Their Copies". Conservation Science in Cultural Heritage. 15: 57–84. doi:10.6092/issn.1973-9494/6168.

Articles

- Cohen, Jennie (30 August 2018). "Has the Original Mona Lisa Been Found?". history.com. A&E Television Networks.
- Evans, Robert (13 February 2013). "New proof said found for "original" Mona Lisa". Reuters.
- Holland, Oscar (6 September 2019). "Leonardo da Vinci may have painted another 'Mona Lisa.' Now, there's a legal battle over who owns it". CNN. Cable News Network.
- Kallir, Jane (23 November 2018). "Art authentication is not an exact science". The Art Newspaper.
- Konody, Paul George (15 February 1914). "Another 'Mona Lisa' Found in London?". The New York Times.
- Lorenzi, Rossella (27 September 2012). "Younger, Happier Mona Lisa: Is It A Da Vinci?". Live Science. Future US.
- Rosenbaum, Matthew (27 September 2012). "Second Mona Lisa Unveiled for First Time in 40 Years". ABC News.
- Sooke, Alastair (16 February 2015). "The Isleworth Mona Lisa: A second Leonardo masterpiece?". BBC.

Web

- The Editors of Encyclopaedia Britannica (18 July 2019). "Mona Lisa". Encyclopædia Britannica, inc.
- The Mona Lisa Foundation. "Foundation - The Mona Lisa Foundation". The Mona Lisa Foundation.
