= Leeds University Library's Cookery Collection =

UoL Library: Cookery Collection
- Location: The Brotherton Library, Leeds, United Kingdom
- Type: Archives, rare books, manuscripts
- Established: 1939
- Branch of: Special Collections, University of Leeds Library

Collection
- Items collected: Printed cookery books, cookery manuscripts from approximately 16th – 21st century (with one item from 2500 BC)
- Size: Over 9,000 items
- Criteria for collection: Cookery, recipes, food history, food production, household management, medicinal uses of food, brewing, gardening

Access and use
- Access requirements: Visit Special Collections, Brotherton Library - request items in advance

Other information
- Website: Special Collections: Cookery Collection

Leeds University Libraries' Cookery Collection is one of the five Designated collections held by the Brotherton Library at the University of Leeds. It comprises an extensive collection of international books, manuscripts and archives relating to food, cooking and culinary culture.

The collection began with a donation in 1939 to the Library of 1,500 books and a selection of manuscripts. The collection has grown since and been supplemented with further donations. It now consists of more than 8,000 printed cookery books and 75 manuscripts, spanning the period 2500 BC to present day, with the majority of the works from the early 16th–20th century.

In addition to recipes and cookery books, the collection includes texts about food production, household management, brewery, gardening and the medicinal uses of food.

Numerous food historians have used the Cookery Collection to inform their research and publications. The Cookery Collection is located in Special Collections in the Brotherton Library, University of Leeds.

== Designation ==
The Cookery Collection was awarded Designation status in 2005 by the Museums, Libraries and Archives Council. The Designation Scheme is a mark of distinction which recognises collections in non-national institutions of outstanding national and international importance for users. The scheme is now administered by Arts Council England.

The Cookery Collection is one of five Designated collections held by Special Collections at Leeds University Library. It is the only library to hold five Designated collections.

== History ==
=== Overview ===
The Cookery Collection encompasses a series of collections from different origins acquired by the Brotherton Library and grouped together by the subject of cookery as a single collection group.

=== Blanche Legat Leigh's donation ===
The Cookery Collection at Special Collections in the Brotherton Library began in 1939 when Blanche Legat Leigh, the Lady Mayoress of Leeds, donated her 1,500 printed books and some manuscript volumes to the Library. The majority of these books were British, French and Italian cookery books dating from the early 16th century to 1930. An item of note from Leigh's collection is a first edition of Mrs Beeton’s Book of Household Management with a letter inserted in it written to Leigh from Mrs Beeton’s son, Sir Mayson Beeton. Leigh’s donation included her correspondence with book owners held in Special Collections’ archives.

=== John Preston's donation ===
In 1954 some of the books from Blanche Leigh's collection were displayed in an exhibition titled Cookery Books 1500–1954 held in the Times Bookshop in London. John F Preston was also displaying his collection at this exhibition and became interested in Leeds University Library's collection. In 1962 he presented his collection to the Library of over 600 English cookery books dating from 1584 to 1861.

=== Later donations ===
In the 1980s the Camden Public Library in London was finding it difficult to allocate adequate space to their collection of books on food and drink. Their cookery books were advertised and acquired by the Brotherton Library. The books spanned 1900–1975 expanding the historical coverage of the Library's Cookery Collection.

After the death in 2006 of Michael Bateman, the food writer and journalist, Leeds University Library received his collection of international cookery books in 2011. Special Collections also holds an archive of his papers from his career as a food writer.

=== Previously held collections ===
Some material already held by the Brotherton Library and related to cookery has since been associated with the Cookery Collection. These include Alfred Chaston Chapman’s collection of books about beer and brewery which was donated to Leeds University Library in 1939.

=== New acquisitions ===
The Cookery Collection at Leeds University Library is still being augmented with new acquisitions. Leeds University Library collects manuscripts about cookery or medicinal remedies with a regional focus. More generally, Leeds University Library aims to collect titles not already represented in the Cookery Collection.

== Collections and highlights ==
The Cookery Collection has been catalogued in two distinct groups: Cookery Manuscripts and Cookery Printed Books. The Cookery Printed Books collection has been split into several series and sub-collections. These include Cookery A: British books, Cookery B: French books, Cookery C: Chinese books, Cookery D: books from other cultures. Later donations, such as those from Michael Bateman and Camden Library, are grouped in separate series. The following items are some of the most notable items in the Cookery Collection. The headings indicate the sub-collection or series under which each item is catalogued.

=== Ancient texts ===
In Blanche Leigh's original 1939 donation to Leeds University Library included a Babylonian clay tablet dating approximately 2500 BC. This Middle Eastern tablet was once used a receipt for barley with ancient cuneiform script marks. It is on permanent display in the Treasures of the Brotherton Gallery.

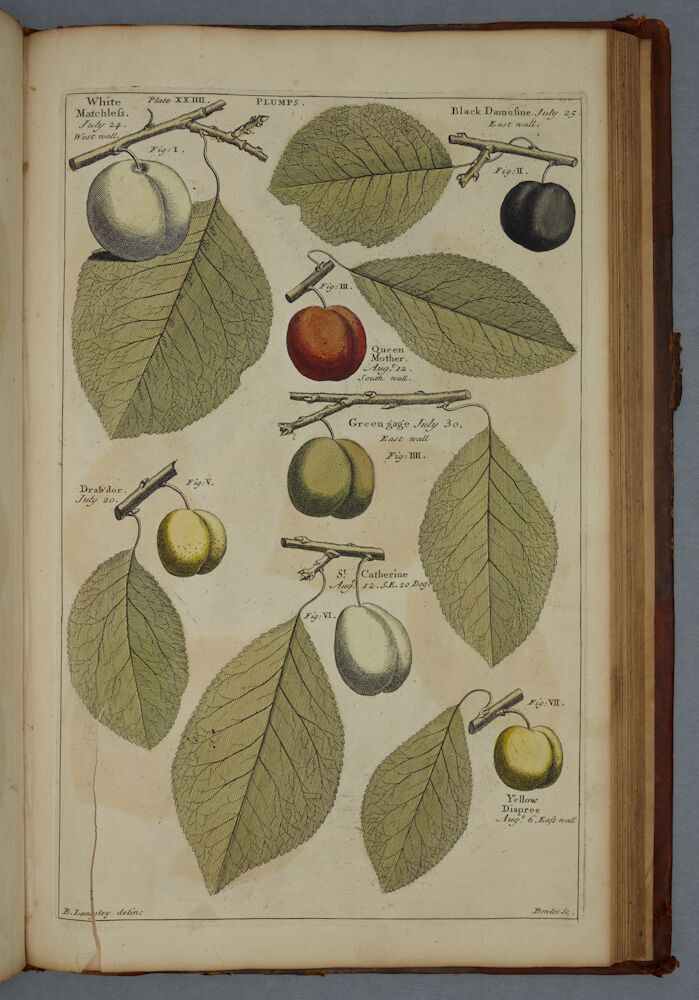
Pomona or the Fruit Garden Illustrated by Batty Langley

=== Cookery A, British printed cookery books ===
Cookery A consists of British printed cookery books. Among the major works held are four copies of Hannah Woolley’s The Queen-Like Closet. The earliest edition is from 1672. Woolley was one of the first women in England who earned a living from writing and selling books. There are two copies of Pomona: or the Fruit Garden Illustrated (1729) written by the English garden designer, Batty Langley; the book is a gardener's manual for growing, picking and preserving fruits, as well as pruning and caring for plants. Charles Carter's The Complete Practical Cook: or, a new system of the whole art and mystery of cookery (1730) is an illustrated recipe book. It contains copperplate engravings showing how to set and arrange a table for various courses in an 18th-century dinner. Charles Carter cooked for nobility and specialised in French baroque cuisine.

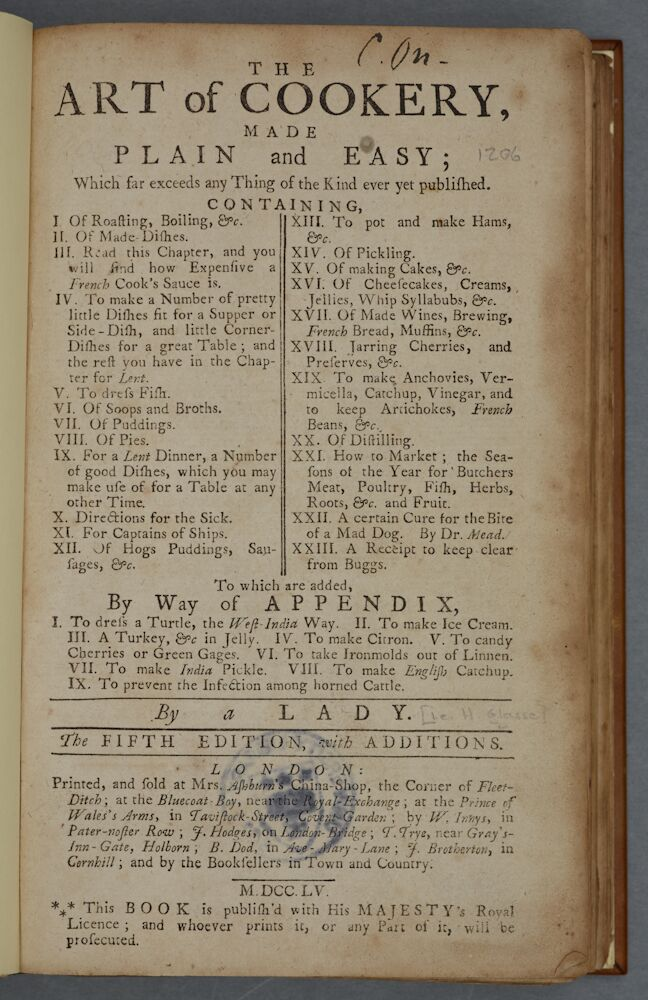
The Art of Cookery Made Plain and Easy, by Hannah Glasse

The Cookery Collection holds several different editions of The Art of Cookery Made Plain and Easy by Hannah Glasse, first published in 1747. This book was a best seller for more than one hundred years and was written to help instruct servants in the preparing of meals. In the collection there are also four copies of The Forme of Cury, a compilation from about 1390 of medieval recipes written by the cooks of Richard II and then edited and published by Samuel Pegge in 1780. It is one of the oldest known English cookery manuscripts.

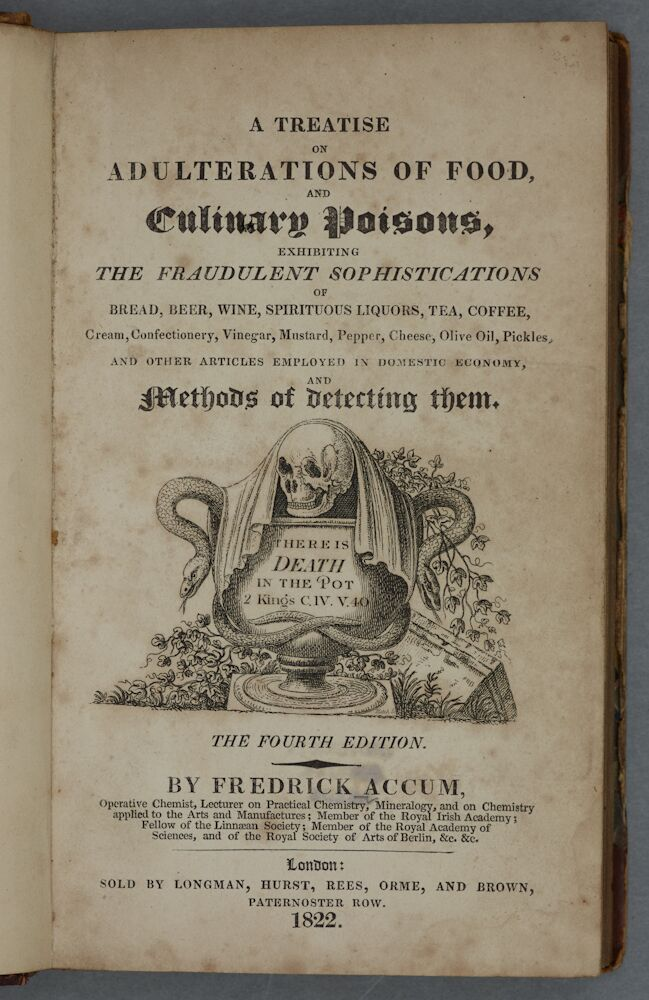
A Treatise on Adulterations of Food, and Culinary Poisons by Friedrich Christian Accum

In the Cookery Collection there are multiple copies of one of the earliest health and safety conscious food books, Friedrich Christian Accum's A Treatise on Adulterations of Food and Culinary Poisons (1822). The text provides instructions about how to identify dangerous additives in common foods and raises awareness about the dishonest practices of food sellers who use adulterated food to increase sales.

Eliza Acton’s Modern Cookery, in all its Branches: Reduced to a System of Easy Practice, for the use of Private Families was first published in 1845 and a number of editions are in the Cookery Collection at Leeds. Acton was extremely influential because she was the first cookery book writer to list the ingredients needed in a recipe and to note how long a dish takes to cook - an innovation which has become a standard feature of modern recipes.

The Cookery Collection is home to seven copies of the Victorian best seller, Mrs Beeton's Book of Household Management; Comprising Information for the Mistress, edited by Mrs Beeton and first published in 1861. The book is a collection of recipes and advice for women about conducting their housekeeping duties. It was an enormous commercial success and sold 2 million copies by 1868.

=== Cookery D, foreign printed cookery books ===
The Cookery D collection contains a large number of printed cookery books from Italy and a number other countries. Opera di Bartolomeo Scappi (1570) is an illustrated Italian cook book with recipes and images of kitchen utensils. The author is Bartolomeo Scappi, renowned renaissance chef, who cooked for Pope Pius IV and Pope Pius V in the Vatican kitchen.

Cookery D also contains the one incunabulum in the Cookery Collection, which the Library received in Blanche Leigh's donation. Regimen sanitatis Salernitanum is a poem which offers the reader a health regime and advice about keeping a good diet, for example, it recommends not overeating. The exact date of the copy in the Cookery Collection is unknown but it is thought to be post 1500 and is cited in The British Library's Incunabula Short Title Catalogue. Its printer Bernardino dei Vitali was active from 1494 to 1539.

=== Cookery Camden donation ===
Among Camden Public Library's donation of 20th century cookery books to Leeds University Library were many works by the influential cookery writer, Elizabeth David. In her first cook book, A Book of Mediterranean Food (1950), she reintroduced more exotic ingredients – such as figs, garlic and olive oil – that had been absent from British cooking during the war.

=== Chaston Chapman brewing donation ===
Alfred Chaston Chapman was a chemist with a specialist interest in fermentation and brewing. He was president of the Institute of Brewing and Distilling from 1911 to 1913. In 1939 his widow donated to Leeds University Library his collection of books which cover the history of brewing, wine-making, the legality of alcohol and drinking in society. Some titles in his collection include: The Anatomy of Drunkenness (1840), The History and Science of Drunkenness (1883) and Oxford Night Caps: Being a Collection of Receipts for Making Various Beverages Used in the University (1835).

=== Cookery Manuscripts ===
Individual manuscript volumes in the Cookery Collection have been grouped in the archive collection, Cookery Manuscripts. There are 75 items spanning the period 1561–2000 and covering the subjects of cookery, household management and medicinal remedies. Some of these manuscripts were part of Blanche Leigh and John Preston's original donations to Leeds University Library but there are more recent acquisitions.

== Research and outreach ==
=== Research topics ===
The Cookery Collection at Leeds University Library is a research resource for scholars.

- Cookery books are sources for attitudes, practices, trade and linguistics from a range of historical periods. The study of the Cookery Collection's early cook books can shed light on the social and economic characteristics of past societies.
- Cookery books can offer insight into a society's political climate. Conflicts and wars effect the availability of ingredients. As the British Empire expanded, the English cookery book used new dishes, foods and spices. Such changes can be observed in the Cookery Collection at Leeds University Library.
- The illustrations in cook books held in the Cookery Collection form an outlet for study. Etchings and engravings reflect evolving practices in printing and the book industry.
- Studies of the history of medicine have been informed by the Cookery Collection at Leeds University Library because many of the books discuss nutrition, health and the medicinal uses of food.
- In many cases the Cookery Collection at Leeds University Library holds long sequences of editions of outstanding works by popular authors such as Mrs Beeton and Hannah Glasse. These long runs and multiple copies mean that a text's development across editions can be studied. Innovations and changes in the book and printing industry can also be observed.
- Other focuses of the Cookery Collection include British cooking, French cooking, Chinese cooking, gardening, beer and brewery and wine and wine-making.
- An undergraduate internship programme through the Digital Creativity and Cultures Hub at the University of Leeds has been exploring how to make the collection more accessible and engaging through innovative digital technology including AI-assisted transcription of manuscripts. The project has also experimented with generative AI to create images of what the recipes might have looked like.

=== Historians ===
The Cookery Collection at Leeds University Library has informed an array of publications. C. Anne Wilson was an assistant librarian at the Brotherton Library and catalogued the Preston donation to the Leeds University Library Cookery Collection in 1964. This inspired her interest in food history. She went on to found the Leeds Symposium on Food History in 1986, so the Brotherton Library's Cookery Collection was integral to the establishment of the Symposium. The Leeds Symposium has held annual meetings for the discussion of food history and the presentation of papers since 1986. C. Anne Wilson wrote Food and Drink in Britain (1973) which draws on the Cookery Collection's early cook books. She wrote The Book of Marmalade which was published in 1985. In it, she cites the Cookery Collection: "Many of the older recipe books consulted are among those in the Blanche Leigh and John F Preston collections of early cookery books in the Brotherton Library at the University of Leeds." C. Anne Wilson edited Luncheon, Nuncheon and Other Meals: Eating with the Victorians (1994) and The Country Kitchen Garden 1600–1950 (1998). Both of these books mention the Brotherton Library's Cookery Collection in their acknowledgements.

Eileen White was a food historian specialising in domestic English cookery in the 15th and 16th centuries. White edited and contributed to The English Cookery Book: Historical Essays, based on papers from the 16th Leeds Symposium on Food History held in March 2001. The book celebrates the Cookery Collection at Leeds University Library and pays tribute to its value for researchers. Illustrations in the book are taken from the Brotherton Library's collection. White also edited Feeding a City: York (2000) and The English Kitchen: Historical Essays (2007), which also acknowledge the Brotherton Library's Cookery Collection. In 2003 White wrote Soup in which she acknowledges "The collection of cookery books in the Brotherton Library at Leeds University has given me access to a wide range of original sources."

Peter Brears, Lynette Hunter and Jennifer Stead are other food historians who have consulted the Cookery Collection at Leeds University Library and contributed essays to the Leeds Symposium on Food History publications. Cecilia Leong-Salobir cites "The Cookery Collection, Leeds University Library" as source in the acknowledgments for her book, The Food Culture in Colonial Asia: A Taste of Empire, Routledge, 2011.

=== In books ===
- A Descriptive Guide to the Libraries of the University of Leeds (1946), Richard Offor, Brotherton Library: Offor describes Blanche Leigh's donation in detail, including the Babylonian tablet and the works of Hannah Glasse and Mrs Beeton.
- The English Cookery Book: Historical Essays (2004), edited by Eileen White, Prospect Books: In the Preface to this publication, Eileen White writes: "The existence of the Leeds Symposium on Food History is due to the large and varied collection of cookery books in the Brotherton Library. These books are a rich resource, not only for cooks, and deserve to be celebrated." In the third chapter of this book, Anne Wilson discusses the Cookery Collection at the Brotherton Library in great depth. She gives an account of its history, the range of topics it covers and the research it has informed.
- Secret Leeds (2007) by John Edwards, David Marsh, Christopher Allen, Amberley Publishing Limited: This book investigates the city of Leeds and highlights its fascinating features, including the Cookery Collection at University of Leeds. It discusses the history of the collection, its structure and composition as well as some of its notable, bizarre and interesting items.
- International Dictionary of Library Histories (2016), ed. By David H. Stam, Routledge: In this reference book Stam cites cookery as a subject strength and area of concentration for the University of Leeds Libraries. He discusses the history of the Cookery Collection shows that it has been augmented with further donations over time.
- Directory of Rare Books and Special Collections in the UK and Republic of Ireland (2016), Ed by. Karen Attar, Facet Publishing: This book recognizes the Cookery Collection at Leeds University Library and discusses its contributions from Blanche Leigh, John Preston, Michael Bateman as well as the brewery collection of Chaston Chapman.

== Access ==
A guide to the Cookery Collection is available on the Leeds University Library website. This provides an overview to the collection, its history and its uses. The Cookery Collection has been fully catalogued online. In the Library catalogue the contents and hierarchy of the Cookery Collection can be viewed, as can descriptions of individual items. A selection of pieces in the Cookery Collection have been photographed and digitised. Researchers can consult the Cookery Collection in person by visiting the reading room in Special Collections at the Brotherton Library, University of Leeds.
