= Snail water =

Historical medicinal drink

Snail water is a historic concoction prepared using snails, which was drunk and applied to the skin. It appeared in Europe from at least the 16th century, and in England in cookbooks frequently during the 17th and 18th centuries. Several preparations credited the drink with possessing medicinal properties, and it is recorded in at least one context being applied to the skin.

A basic preparation of snail water was made by distilling a mixture of snails, herbs, spices, and wine.

== History ==
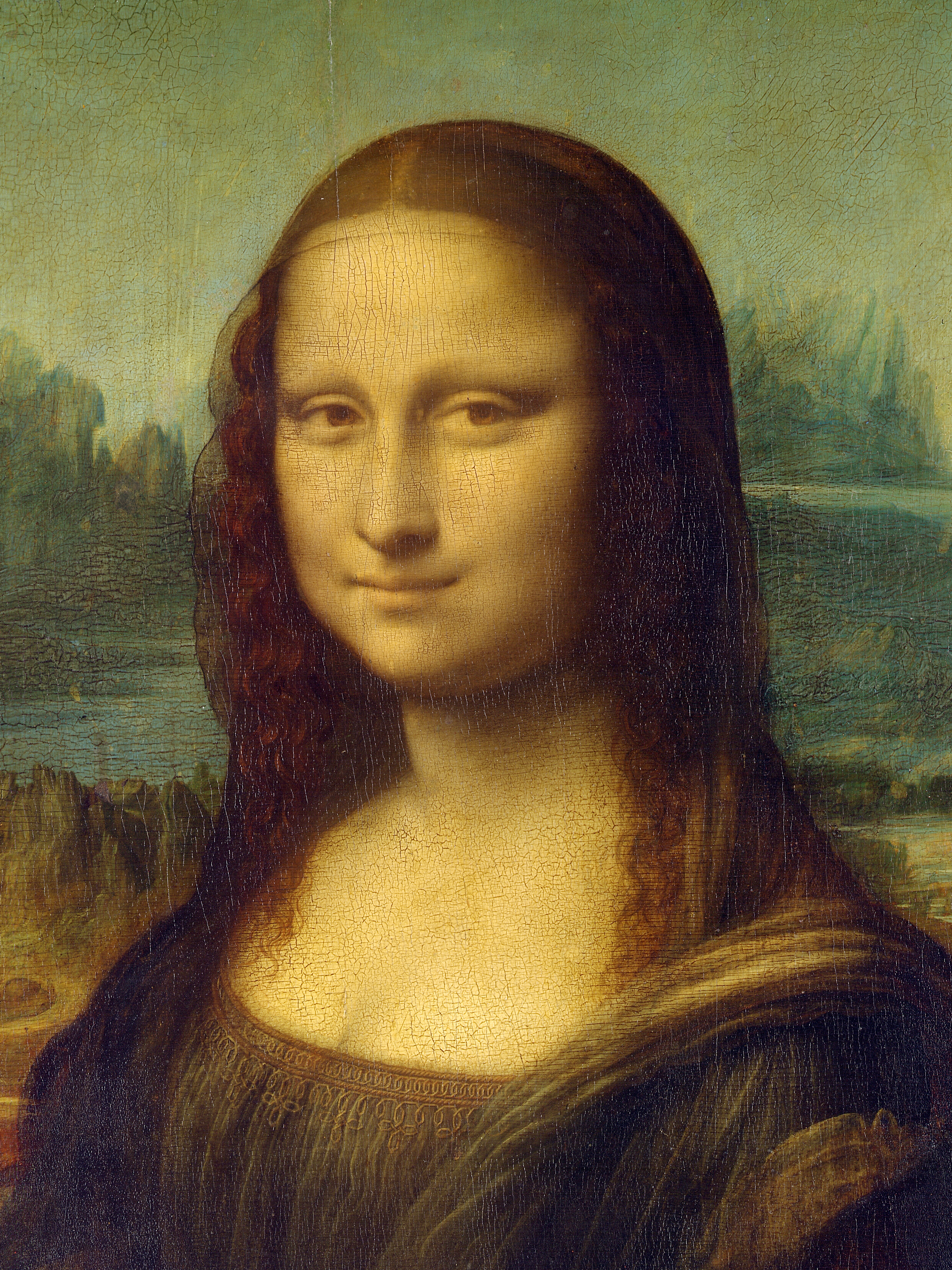
Lisa del Giocondo, the subject of Da Vinci's Mona Lisa is known to have purchased 'distillato d’acqua di chiocciole' ("a distillation of snail water") from a Florentine convent in 1514.

Snails have been described as possessing medicinal benefits since antiquity. A predecessor of the early modern snail water tradition comes from Pliny the Elder, writing in the first century AD. To treat sore throats or colds, Pliny suggests boiling snails, crushing them and adding them to raisin wine.

Snail water was being prepared in Europe by the 1500s. The German surgeon and apothecary Hieronymus Brunschwig describes its use in his 1500 text Liber de arte distillandi de simplicibus, writing that 'Schnecken wasser' can cure warts and make iron as hard as steel. Lisa del Giocondo, the subject of da Vinci's Mona Lisa, is known to have purchased 'distillato d’acqua di chiocciole' ("a distillation of snail water") from the Sant'Orsola convent in Florence in August 1514, paying 7 lire. In England, recipes appear frequently in cookery texts in the 17th and 18th centuries. Snails had been commonly eaten in England during the Roman era, but over time had become rare. This changed around the 17th century through the influence of French cooks such as La Varenne, bringing snails into English diets in forms such as pottage, pie, stewed and fried.

Grace Mildmay, an English noblewoman and medical practitioner, wrote on a distilled snail water as a remedy for jaundice in her manuscripts, dating from circa 1570–1617. She recommends a preparation including molluscs with herbs—angelica, celandine, and rosemary—as well as cloves and hartshorn, which was made from the antlers of a male deer. Two recipes for snail water appear in the 1655 manuscript collection The Queens Closet Opened, and Hannah Woolley includes one that contains sugar in A Supplement to the Queen-Like Closet (1675), which she called "most admirable in Consumptions". Consumption (the archaic term for tuberculosis) was the ailment the drink was most often administered for, often prepared with saffron. In some texts, authors presented snail water as an imitation donkey's milk, calling the drink "the made asses milk".

Recipes for snail water continued to appear frequently in England in the 18th century. Early in the century, the medical writer John Quincy included six recipes for snail water in his book Pharmacopœia Officinalis as treatments for consumption. Quincy was critical of some of the more elaborate preparations, considering them ineffective. To his mind, the best snail water was made by boiling snails in a solution of milk and sugar. Books continued to include recipes for snail water into the 19th century, as snails were becoming rare in English diets. A late preparation is given by Charles Elmé Francatelli in 1846 in his book The Modern Cook, presenting a recipe for a beverage with "soothing qualities" to treat persistent coughs, that includes snails with frogs and saffron. Francatelli includes a later recipe for a "Mucillaginous Broth" containing a pint of snails in 1861, in his manual The Cook’s Guide. (See below).

== Sample recipes ==
Two recipes for snail water appear in the manuscript collection The Queens Closet Opened. The first is contained in the section The Compleat Cook, giving a recipe for "A Snail Water for weak Children, and old People":

Take a pottle of Snails, and wash them well in two or three waters, and then in small Beer, bruise them shells and all, then put them into a gallon of red Cows Milk, red Rose leaves dried, the whites cut off, Rosemary, sweet Marjoram, of each one handful, and so distil them in a cold still, and let it drop upon powder of white Sugar candy in the receiver; drink of it first and last, and at four a clock in the afternoon, a wine-glass full at a time.

The second appears in the section A Queens Delight, titled "The admirable and most famous Snail water". (Note: The writer Gary Allen comments on this recipe's claim to clear "all Obstructions", stating that while most treatments of the era would not have worked, "it is difficult to imagine that an 'obstruction' that could stand in the face of a dose of 'admirable and most famous Snail Water'")

Take a peck of garden shell snails, wash them well in small beer, and put them in a hot Oven till they have done making a noise, then take them out, and wipe them well from the green froth that is upon them, and bruise them shells and all in a stone Mortar, then take a quart of earth worms, scower them with salt, slit them & wash them well with water from their filth, and in a stone Mortar beat them to pieces, then lay in the bottom of your distilled pot Angelica two handfuls, and two handfuls of Celandine upon them, to which put two quarts of Rosemary flowers, Bears foot, Agrimony, red Dock Roots, Bark of Barberries, Betony, Wood sorrel, of each two handfuls, Rue one handful; then lay the Snails and worms on the top of the Herbs and Flowers, then pour on three Gallons of the strongest Ale, and let it stand all night, in the morning put in three ounces of Cloves beaten, six penniworth of beaten Saffron and on the top of them six ounces of shaved Harts-horn, then set on the Limbeck, and close it with paste, and so receive the water by pints, which will be nine in all, the first is the strongest, whereof take in the morning two spoonfuls in four spoonfuls of small Beer, and the like in the afternoon; you must keep a good Diet and use moderate exercise to warm the blood. This Water is good against all Obstructions whatsoever. It cureth a Consumption and Dropsie, the stopping of the Stomach and Liver. It may be distilled with milk for weak people and children, with Harts-tongue and Elecampance.

'The Cook's Guide, and Housekeepers and Butler's Assistant' (1861) by Charles Elmé Francatelli includes a recipe for "Mucilaginous Broth":

Put a cut-up chicken, a pound of veal cutlet, and a calf foot into a stewpan, with 3 pints of water, boil and skim; then add a dozen crayfish and a pint of garden snails, both bruised raw in a mortar; add also a handful of balm, borrage and chervil, 3 ounces of prepared Iceland moss, and a small quantity of salt. The broth must boil very gently by the side of the fire for about two hours without much reduction, and when done is to be strained into a basin for use.

== See also ==
- Snails as food

== Sources ==
- Allen, Gary (2016). Can It!: The Perils and Pleasures of Preserving Foods. London: Reaktion Books. ISBN 978-1-78023-572-1.
- Bilton, Sam (2022). Fool's Gold: A History of British Saffron. London: Prospect Books. ISBN 978-1-909248-74-8.
- Brunschwig, Hieronymus (1500). Liber de arte distillandi de simplicibus [Book on the art of distillation out of simple ingredients] (in German) (1st ed.). Strasbourg, Germany: Johann Grüninger.
- Goldstein, David B (2013). Eating and Ethics in Shakespeare's England. Cambridge: Cambridge University Press. ISBN 978-1-107-03906-3.
- Hughes, Glyn (2017). The Lost Foods of England. Winster, Derbyshire: Lulu Press. ISBN 978-0-244-02963-0.
- Kemp, Martin; Pallanti, Giuseppe (2017). Mona Lisa: The People and the Painting. Oxford, Oxfordshire: Oxford University Press. ISBN 978-0-19-874990-5.
- Swinburne, Layinka M (2000). "Milky Medicine and Magic". In Walker, Harlan (ed.). Milk-- Beyond the Dairy: Proceedings of the Oxford Symposium on Food and Cookery 1999. Totnes, Devon: Prospect Books. ISBN 1-903018-06-4.
- Wilson, C Anne (1976). Food and Drink in Britain: From the Stone Age to Recent Times. Harmondsworth, Middlesex: Penguin Books. ISBN 0-14-055101-8.
