= Sussex pond pudding =

English dessert

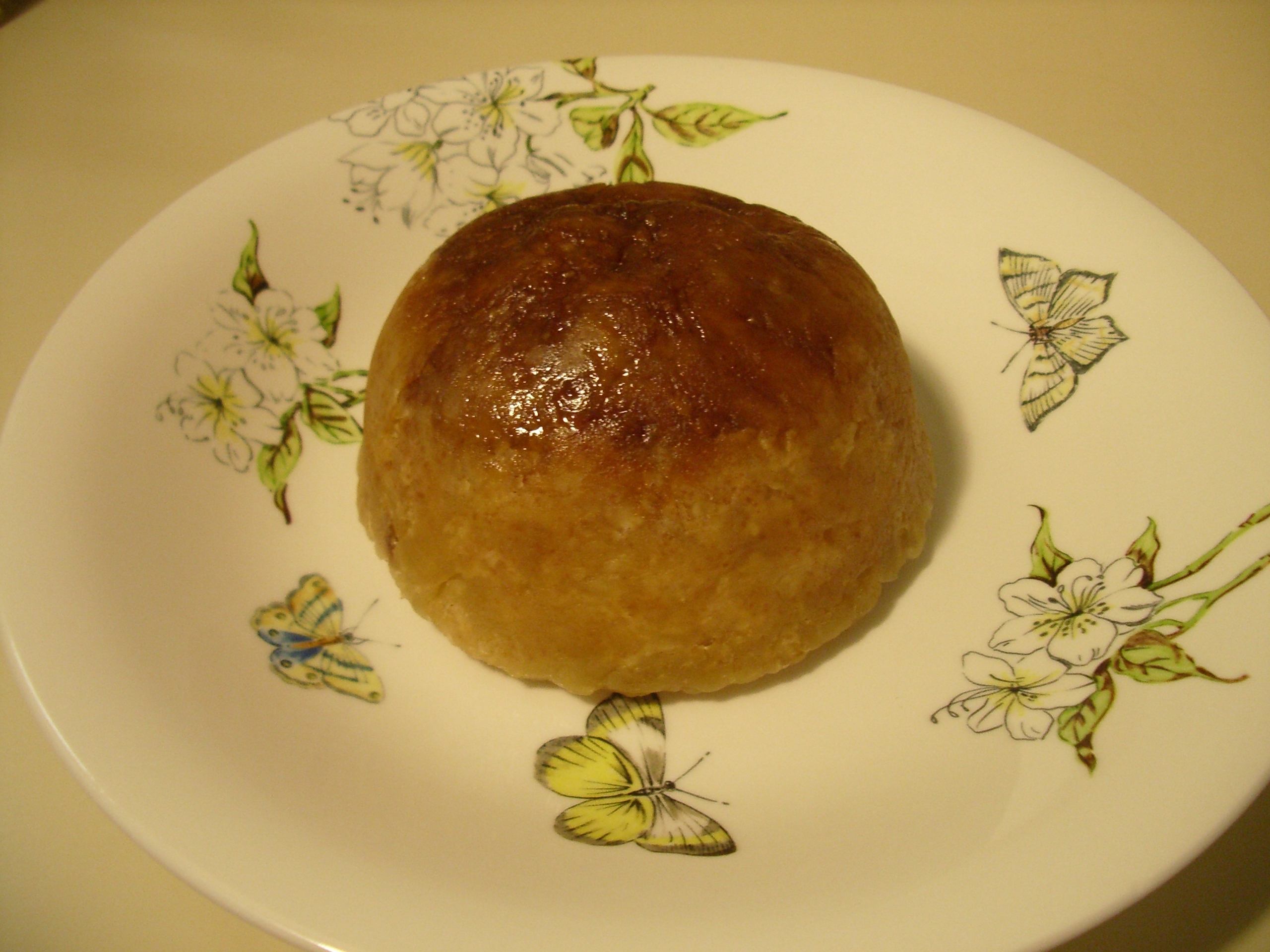
- Alternative names: Well pudding
- Type: Pudding
- Place of origin: United Kingdom
- Region or state: Sussex, Kent
- Main ingredients: Suet pastry, lemon, butter, sugar

Sussex pond pudding, or well pudding, is a traditional English pudding from the southern county of Sussex. It is made of a suet pastry, filled with butter and sugar, and is boiled or steamed for several hours. Modern versions of the recipe often include a whole lemon enclosed in the pastry. The dish is first recorded in Hannah Woolley's 1672 book The Queen-Like Closet.

The pudding has gone out of fashion over the years, perhaps due to diet consciousness, although the British chef Heston Blumenthal has served it as part of his campaign to revive historic British foods. Few restaurants serve it.

A variant including currants is known from both Sussex and Kent. In Sussex, this was formerly called "Blackeyed Susan". The Kentish version is known as "Kentish well pudding", a recipe included in Eliza Acton's pioneering 19th century cookery book Modern Cookery for Private Families. "Well pudding" was also said to have been the more familiar name for the dish in East Sussex.

== Preparation ==
While cooking, the filling ingredients create a thick, caramelised sauce, which upon serving and cutting of the pudding, runs out and pools around the plate, creating a "pond". After cooking for so long, the skin of the lemon, if included, almost candies like a marmalade in its own juices and that of the butter and sugar.

Like other suet puddings, traditional recipes call for beef suet for making the pastry, but vegetable shortening, or even cold butter, can be substituted for similar results.

The modern filling usually contains fruit in addition to sugar and butter. Recipes suggest using thin-skinned, juicy lemons.

== History ==
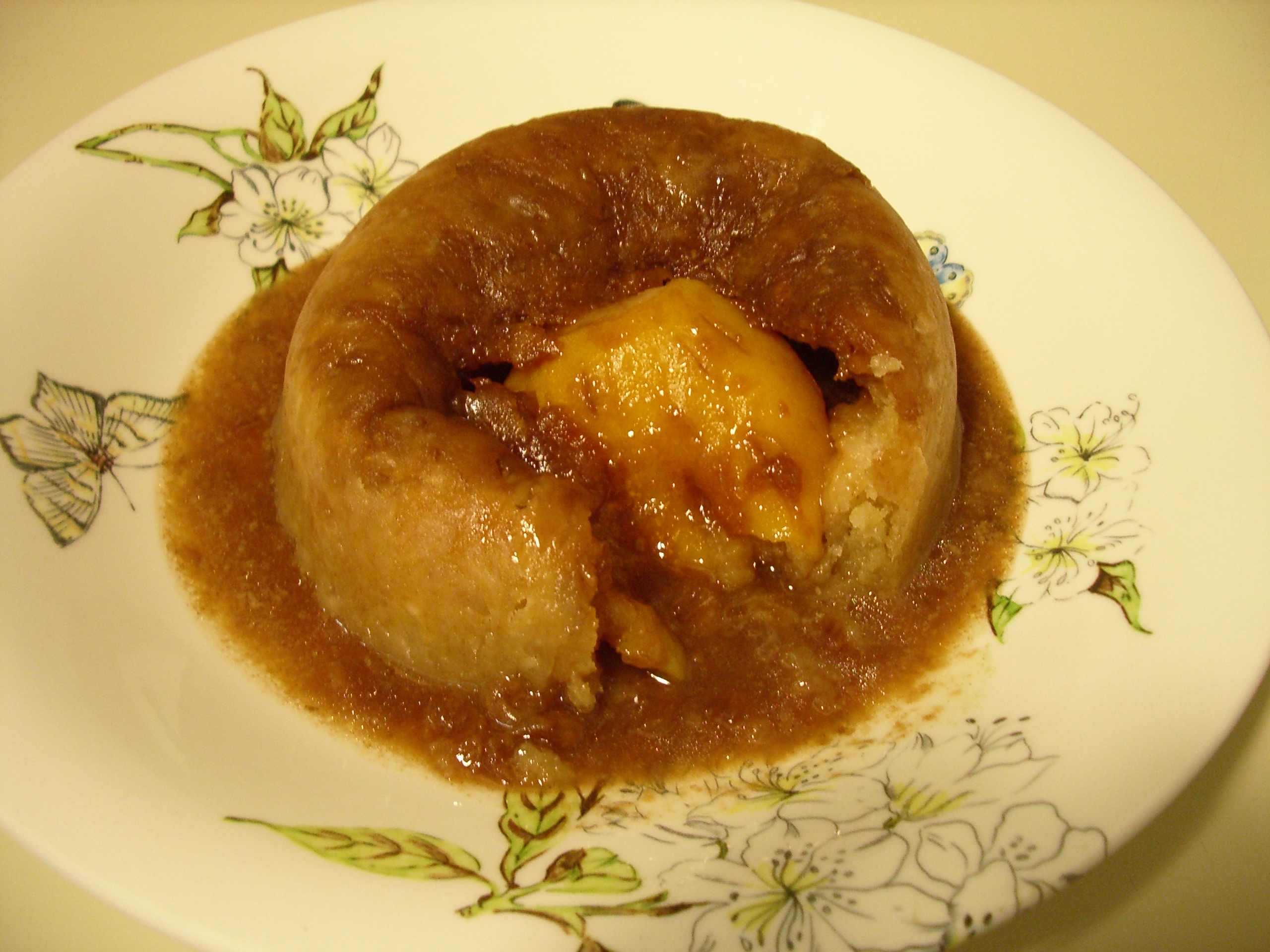
Sliced Sussex pond pudding

The first recorded recipe for the Sussex pond pudding is (as "a Sussex pudding") in Hannah Woolley's The Queen-Like Closet (1672). The recipe features an egg-enriched pastry wrapped around a "great piece of Butter". Woolley suggests adding sugar and rosewater only after cooking and cutting open the pudding, and garnishes the cooked pudding with barberries.

The 18th-century Sussex shopkeeper and diarist Thomas Turner described the dish as "butter pond pudding", complaining about the amount of butter it contained. He also mentioned eating pond pudding with currants. It appears that at this stage of its history the pudding was not prepared with a lemon: as with the recipe given by Woolley, older cookery books and recipes do not actually call for use of a lemon at all. A recipe found by Florence White, and included in her 1932 book Good Things in England, was based on one supplied to her by H J Glover and said to have been made "boiled in a cloth (the correct way) in 1905 by an old cottage woman in the village of Westham":

Make a good suet crust, put in some currants, and a little sugar.

Divide in two and roll each piece into a rather thick round. Put into the middle of one round a ball of butter mixed with sugar, using the proportions of a 1/2 lb. butter to 1/4 lb. demerara sugar. Gather up the edges of the crust, and enclose the butter ball securely by covering the join with the second round crust and pinching that up.

Put into a floured cloth, tie up rather tightly and boil 3 hours or more according to size.

— Florence White

Writing in 1939, the journalist and biographer Reginald Pound described "my native Sussex pond pudding" as "made of crust, brown sugar and butter", with lemons not mentioned. The first recorded version using a whole lemon was published in Jane Grigson's English Food (1974). Grigson said that the bitterness of the lemon improved the dish, claiming "versions of this pudding without the lemon are not worth bothering about".

In her A History of English Food, Clarissa Dickson Wright describes the pudding as requiring "considerable flair to make", as the cook needs to scratch the lemon "so that its flavours burst out while it is being cooked".

== See also ==
- List of lemon dishes and beverages
- List of steamed foods

== Sources ==
- English Food, Jane Grigson, Penguin Books Ltd, 1998 Edition
- English Puddings, Sweet and Savoury, Mary Norwak, Grub Street Publishing, 2004 Edition
