= Vespucci =

Vespucci may refer to:

== People ==
=== Surname ===
- Agostino Vespucci of Florence
- Amerigo Vespucci, Italian explorer, assistant of Christopher Columbus and after whom the American continent was named.
- Simonetta Vespucci, Italian Renaissance noblewoman from Genoa

== Other uses ==
- Ponte Amerigo Vespucci, a bridge over the Arno River in Florence, Italy
- Italian training ship Amerigo Vespucci, a tall ship of the Italian Navy
- Vespucci, a map editing program for OpenStreetMap
