= Lisa del Giocondo =

Italian noblewoman (1479–1542)

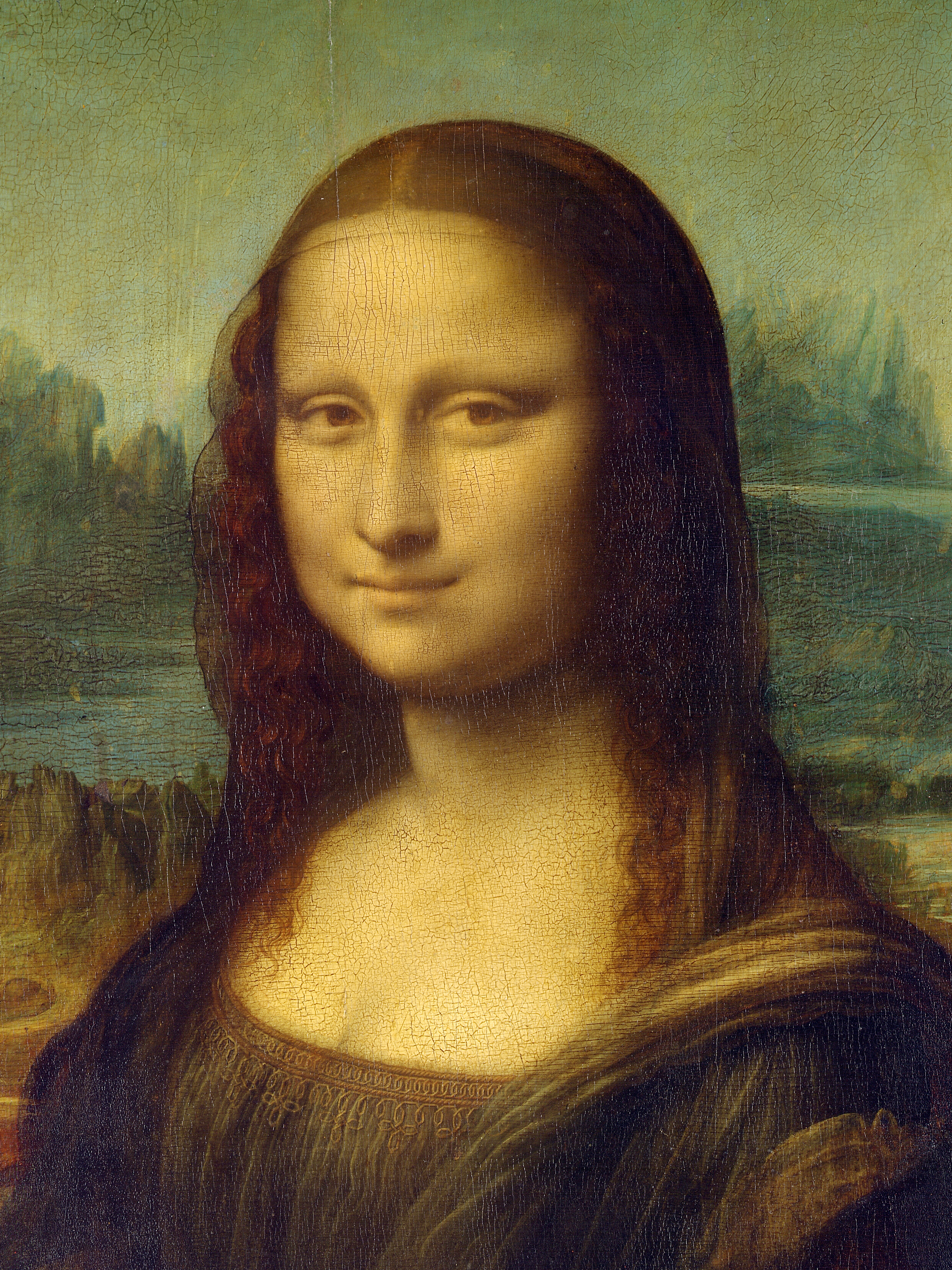
- Detail of Mona Lisa (above) by Leonardo da Vinci
- Born: Lisa Camilla di Antonmaria Gherardini; June 15, 1479; Florence, Italy
- Died: July 14, 1542 (aged 63); Convent of Saint Orsola, Florence, Italy
- Known for: Subject of Mona Lisa
- Spouse: Francesco di Bartolomeo di Zanobi del Giocondo (m. 1495)
- Children: 6
- Family: Gherardini family

Lisa del Giocondo (Italian pronunciation: [ˈliːza del dʒoˈkondo]; born Lisa Camilla di Antonmaria Gherardini [ɡerarˈdiːni]; June 15, 1479 – July 14, 1542) was an Italian noblewoman and member of the Gherardini family of Florence and Tuscany. Her name was given to the Mona Lisa, her portrait commissioned by her husband and painted by Leonardo da Vinci in the Italian Renaissance.

Little is known about Lisa's life. Lisa was born in Florence. She married in her teens to a cloth and silk merchant who later became a local official; she was a mother to six children and led what is thought to have been a comfortable and ordinary life. Lisa outlived her husband, who was fourteen years her senior.

In the centuries after Lisa's life, the Mona Lisa became the world's most famous painting. In 2005, Lisa was identified as a subject for a Leonardo portrait around 1503, strongly reinforcing the traditional view of her as the model for Mona Lisa.

== Early life ==
Lisa's Florentine family was old and aristocratic, but over time had lost their influence. They were well off but not wealthy, and lived on a farm income in a city where there were great disparities in wealth among inhabitants. Antonmaria di Noldo Gherardini, Lisa's father, came from a family who had lived on properties near San Donato in Poggio and only recently moved to the city. Gherardini at one time owned or rented six farms in Chianti that produced wheat, wine, and olive oil and where livestock was raised.

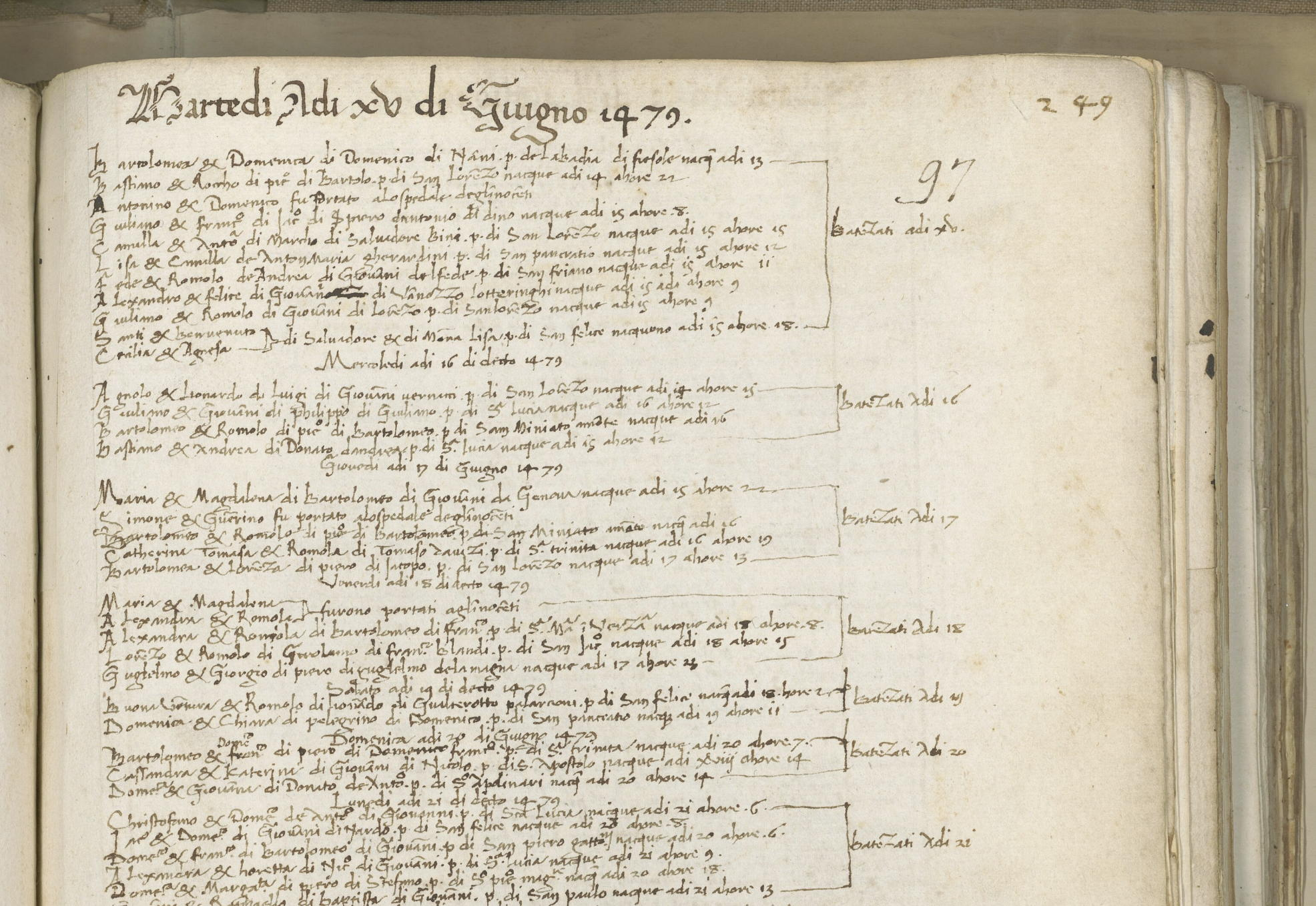
In Florence Cathedral baptismal records for June 1479, Lisa is the sixth entry, listed under her first and second names "Lisa & Camilla".

In 1465, Gherardini married Lisa di Giovanni Filippo de' Carducci, and in 1473 remarried to Caterina di Mariotto Rucellai; both of them died in childbirth. Lisa's mother was Lucrezia del Caccia, daughter of Piera Spinelli, and Gherardini's wife by his third marriage in 1476. Lisa was born in Florence on June 15, 1479, on Via Maggio, although for many years it was thought she was born on Villa Vignamaggio just outside Greve, one of the family's rural properties. She was named for Lisa, a wife of her paternal grandfather. The eldest of seven children, Lisa had three sisters, one of whom was named Ginevra, and three brothers, Giovangualberto, Francesco, and Noldo.

The family lived in Florence, originally near Santa Trinita and later in rented space near Santo Spirito, likely because they were unable to afford repairs when their first house was damaged. Lisa's family moved to what today is called Via dei Pepi, and then near Santa Croce, where they lived near Ser Piero da Vinci, Leonardo's father. They also owned a small country home in San Donato in the village of Poggio about 32 kilometres (20 mi) south of the city. Noldo, Gherardini's father and Lisa's grandfather, had bequeathed a farm in Chianti to the Santa Maria Nuova hospital. Gherardini secured a lease for another of the hospital's farms; the family spent summers there at the house named Ca' di Pesa, so that Gherardini could oversee the wheat harvest.

== Marriage and later life ==
On March 5, 1495, 15-year-old Lisa married 29-year-old Francesco di Bartolomeo del Giocondo, an ambitious cloth and silk merchant, becoming his second wife. (Note: By traditional accounts, Francesco married Tommasa Villani after Camilla Rucellai died. Kemp and Pallanti say that no documents support this other marriage nor does the timeline allow it. Hales reports the same from a meeting with Pallanti.) Her age at marriage was around the norm for Florentine women of the time, who often married men ten or more years their senior. Because her father had not participated in the custom of saving cash at a daughter's birth that compounded interest for dowries, Lisa's dowry was land: her father's most valuable property in Chianti, the San Silvestro farm near her family's country home, which lies between Castellina and San Donato in Poggio, near two farms later owned by Michelangelo. The farm was valued at 400 florins, and its contents at 170 florins. (Note: Journalist Dianne Hales writes that no cash was involved. Lisa's dowry has been reported incorrectly at 170 florins, which Hales writes was the value of the farm's furnishing and contents.) The modest dowry may be a sign that the Gherardini family was not wealthy at the time. Art historian Frank Zöllner says the dowry's small size lends reason to think Francesco may have had true affection for Lisa.

Neither poor nor among the most well-to-do in Florence, the couple lived a comfortable middle-class life. Historian Donald Sassoon says they were upwardly mobile and were among the city's nouveaux riches. Lisa's marriage may have increased her social status because her husband's family may have been richer than her own. Francesco is thought to have benefited because Gherardini was an "old name". They lived in shared accommodation until March 5, 1503, when Francesco was able to buy a house next door to his family's old home in the Via della Stufa. Leonardo is thought to have begun painting Lisa's portrait the same year. Lisa lived in the "Casa grande" on Via della Stufa for nearly forty years.

Lisa and Francesco had six children: Piero, Piera, Camilla, Marietta, Andrea, and Giocondo between 1496 and 1502. Piera and Giocondo both died before they were toddlers. Lisa also raised two of her brother's children after their father's death. Lastly, she raised Bartolomeo, the son of Francesco and his first wife Camilla di Mariotto Rucellai, who died shortly after the birth. The second wife of Lisa's father, Caterina di Mariotto Rucellai, and Francesco's first wife were sisters, members of the Rucellai family. Camilla and Marietta became nuns. Camilla took the name Suor Beatrice and entered the convent of San Domenico di Cafaggio, where she was entrusted to the care of Lisa's sisters Suor Alessandra and Suor Camilla. Beatrice died at age 18, and was buried in the Basilica di Santa Maria Novella.

Adopting roles of a customer and supplier, Lisa developed a relationship with Sant'Orsola, a convent held in high regard in Florence. From the convent, Lisa is known to have purchased distillation of snail water—a medicine listed in formularies of following centuries. Kemp and Pallanti say on another occasion, the nuns purchased from Lisa 30 pounds (14 kg) of cheese made on her family's lands. She was able to place Marietta at Sant'Orsola in 1519. In 1521, Marietta took the name Suor Ludovica; she became a respected member of the convent in a position of some responsibility.

Francesco was a social climber, and not known particularly for his rectitude. He had joined the family business, a respected source of fine textiles, where he had done well, but the promise of higher profits tempted him into other enterprises. He imported sugar, animal hides, wool, and soap. He became a money-lender and dealt in property. Believing that land was a safe investment, Francesco transformed himself into a wealthy landowner after thirty-five years of marriage to Lisa by 1530.

As members of the Silk Guild, Francesco's family was eligible for the highest offices of Florence, and eighty of his relatives occupied such roles over a span of fifty years. Francesco was elected to the Dodici Buonomini in 1499 and to the Signoria in 1512, where he was confirmed as a Priore in 1524. He may have had ties to Medici family political or business interests; he was termed a "friend" rather than a "close friend". In 1512, when the government of Florence feared the return of the Medici from exile, Francesco was imprisoned and fined 1,000 florins. He was released in September when the Medici returned.

== Death and outcome ==
In June 1537, by his last will and testament, Francesco returned Lisa's dowry to her, gave her personal clothing and jewelry and provided for her future. Upon entrusting her care to their daughter Suor Ludovica and, should she be incapable, his son Bartolomeo, Francesco wrote, "Given the affection and love of the testator towards Mona Lisa, his beloved wife; in consideration of the fact that Lisa has always acted with a noble spirit and as a faithful wife; wishing that she shall have all she needs ... ." Martin Kemp and Giuseppe Pallanti remark in their history that Francesco—who provided for an eternal flame on his own grave—willed all of his possessions to his children and not to his wife, and did not guarantee Lisa an annuity, which would have been fairly commonplace.

In one account, Francesco died at age 73 in 1538; then Lisa fell ill and was taken by her daughter Suor Ludovica to the convent of Sant'Orsola, where she died on July 14, 1542, at the age of 63. In his scholarly account of their lives, Frank Zöllner writes that Francesco was nearly 80 years old when he died, and Lisa may have lived until at least 1551, when she would have been 71 or 72. Lisa's death was not recorded by the city or by her family. Her funeral was well-attended, and she was buried not in the family's vault at Santissima Annunziata but at the church of Sant'Orsola. (Note: The reason is unknown. Kemp and Pallanti can only speculate on the reason: it was Lisa's choice, she had broken with her husband, or perhaps it was Ludovica's decision.) After Francesco's death, his sons inherited the family business but were incapable of keeping it from decline; one sold the family home on Via della Stufa to pay his debts to his brother. Francesco's grandson was similarly unprepared to save the business, declared bankruptcy, and found work as a scribe in the convent of Santissima Annunziata.

== Mona Lisa ==
The full Mona Lisa painting (English: Mona Lisa, Italian: La Gioconda, French: La Joconde) by Leonardo da Vinci, Louvre

Like other Florentines of their financial means, Francesco's family members were art lovers and patrons. His son Bartolomeo asked Antonio di Donnino Mazzieri to paint a fresco at the family's burial site in the Basilica della Santissima Annunziata di Firenze. Andrea del Sarto painted a Madonna for another member of his family. Francesco gave commissions to Leonardo for a portrait of his wife and to Domenico Puligo for a painting of Saint Francis of Assisi. He is thought to have commissioned Lisa's portrait to celebrate both Andrea's birth and the purchase of the family's home. Lisa was 24 when Leonardo began her portrait. She was 39 when he died, and the portrait was still partly unfinished.

The Mona Lisa fulfilled 15th- and early 16th-century requirements for portraying a woman of virtue. Lisa is portrayed as a faithful wife through gesture—her right hand rests over her left. Leonardo also presented Lisa as fashionable and successful, perhaps more well-off than she was. Her dark garments and black veil were Spanish-influenced high fashion; they are not a depiction of mourning for her first daughter, as some scholars have proposed. The portrait is strikingly large; its size is equal to that of commissions acquired by wealthier art patrons of the time. This extravagance has been explained as a sign of Francesco and Lisa's social aspiration.

During the spring of 1503, Leonardo had no income source, which may in part explain his interest in a private portrait. Later that year, he most likely had to delay his work on Mona Lisa when he received payment for starting The Battle of Anghiari, which was a more valuable commission and one he was contracted to complete by February 1505. In 1506, Leonardo considered the portrait unfinished. He was not paid for the work and did not deliver it to his client. The artist's paintings travelled with him throughout his life, and he may have completed the Mona Lisa many years later in France, in one estimation by 1516.

The painting's title dates to 1550. An acquaintance of at least some of Francesco's family, Giorgio Vasari, wrote, "Leonardo undertook to paint, for Francesco del Giocondo, the portrait of Mona Lisa, his wife." (Italian: Prese Lionardo a fare per Francesco del Giocondo il ritratto di mona Lisa sua moglie.) The portrait's Italian name La Gioconda is the feminine form of her married name. In French it is known by the variant La Joconde. Although it is derived from Lisa's married name, there is the added significance that the name derives from the word for "happy" (in English: "jocund") or "the happy one".

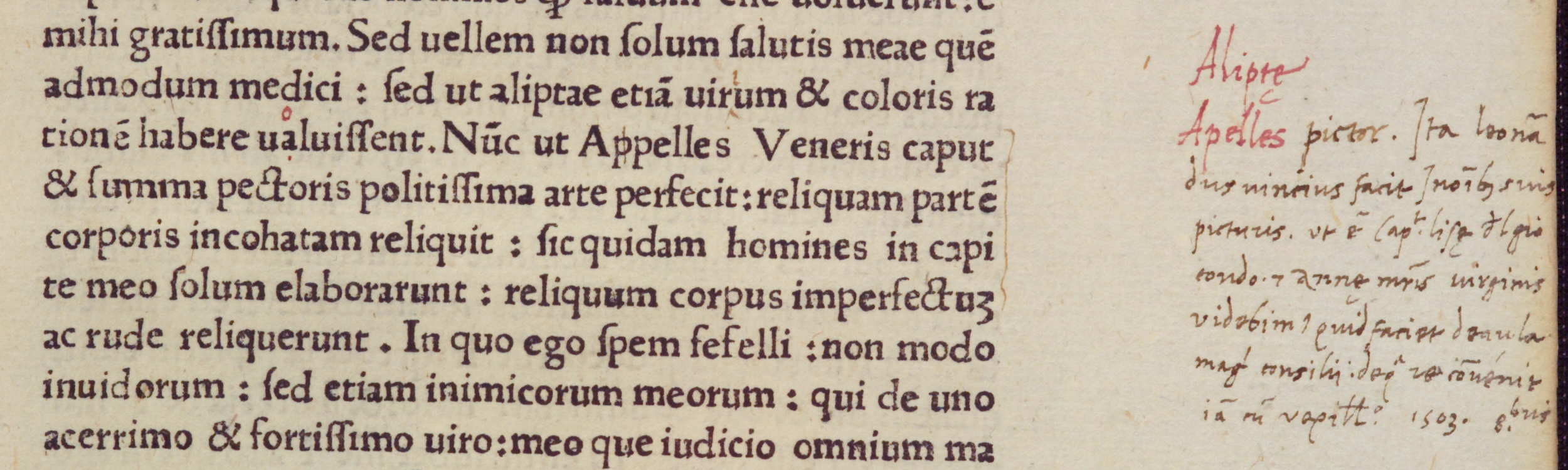
Agostino Vespucci's margin note

Speculation assigned Lisa's name to at least five different paintings, (Note: Five includes two works attributed by one author to Leonardo: the Louvre Mona Lisa (Later Mona Lisa), and the Isleworth Mona Lisa (Earlier Mona Lisa), and some thought by the same author to be copies: Prado Mona Lisa, Reynolds Mona Lisa, and the St. Petersburg Mona Lisa.) and her identity to at least ten different people. (Note: Besides Lisa, Leonardo himself, and Leonardo's mother, the following subjects have been proposed: Caterina Sforza; Isabella d'Este; Isabella of Aragon, Duchess of Milan; Isabella Gualanda; Costanza D'Avalos, Duchess of Francavilla; Filberta di Savoia; and Pacifica Brandano.) Scholar Carmen C. Bambach put the conjecturing to rest "more or less definitively" after an expert at the Heidelberg University Library in 2005 discovered a marginal note in a book in the library's collection—confirming the traditional view that the sitter was Lisa. The rediscovery of Salai’s estate inventory, listing a painting titled La Gioconda, supports the sitter’s identification and implies that the title originated within Leonardo’s circle. The note, written by Agostino Vespucci in 1503, states that Leonardo was working on a portrait of Lisa del Giocondo.

The theft of the Mona Lisa from the Louvre in 1911 and its travels to Asia and North America during the 1960s and 1970s contributed to the painting's iconization and fame. By the end of the 20th century, the painting was a global icon that had been used in more than 300 other paintings and in 2,000 advertisements, appearing at an average of one new advertisement each week. The Mona Lisa has been in France since the 16th century, when Leonardo moved to King Francis I's court and the king acquired it; since the French Revolution, it has been part of a French national collection. By 2006, about six million people view the painting each year at the Louvre in Paris.

== Works cited ==
=== Books ===
- Bambach, Carmen C. (2019). Leonardo da Vinci Rediscovered. Vol. 3. Yale University Press. ISBN 978-0-300-19195-0.
- Hales, Dianne (2014). Mona Lisa: A Life Discovered. Simon and Schuster. ISBN 978-1-4516-5897-2.
- Kemp, Martin (2006). Leonardo Da Vinci: The Marvellous Works of Nature And Man. Oxford University Press. ISBN 0-19-280725-0 – via Google Books.
- Kemp, Martin; Pallanti, Giuseppe (2017). Mona Lisa: The People and the Painting. Oxford University Press. ISBN 978-0-19-106696-2.
- Masters, Roger D. (June 15, 1998). Fortune is a River: Leonardo da Vinci and Niccolò Machiavelli's Magnificent Dream of Changing the Course of Florentine History (online notes for Chapter 6). Free Press via Dartmouth College (dartmouth.edu). ISBN 0-684-84452-4. Archived from the original on February 3, 2009.
- Müntz, Eugène (1898). Leonardo Da Vinci, Artist, Thinker and Man of Science. Vol. 2. New York: Charles Scribner's Sons.
- Pallanti, Giuseppe (2006). Mona Lisa Revealed: The True Identity of Leonardo's Model. Florence, Italy: Skira. ISBN 88-7624-659-2.
- Sassoon, Donald (2001b). Mona Lisa: The History of the World's Most Famous Painting. HarperCollins. ISBN 978-0-00-710615-8.
- Vasari, Giorgio (1879) [1550, rev. ed. 1568]. Milanesi, Gaetano (ed.). Le vite de' più eccellenti pittori, scultori ed architettori. Vol. IV. Firenze: G.C. Sansoni.

=== Journals ===
- Clark, Kenneth (March 1973). "Mona Lisa". The Burlington Magazine. 115 (840): 144–151. ISSN 0007-6287. JSTOR 877242.
- Lorusso, Salvatore; Braida, Angela M.; Natali, Andrea (2019). "The different possibilities of evaluating a work of art: case study of the Mona Lisa". Conservation Science in Cultural Heritage. 19: 307–326.
- Sassoon, Donald (2001a). "Mona Lisa: the Best-Known Girl in the Whole Wide World". History Workshop Journal. 2001 (51). Oxford University Press: 1–18. doi:10.1093/hwj/2001.51.1. ISSN 1477-4569.
- Zöllner, Frank (1993). "Leonardo's Portrait of Mona Lisa del Giocondo". Gazette des Beaux-Arts. 121 (S): 115–138. doi:10.11588/artdok.00004207. ISSN 0016-5530.
