= The Court and Kitchin of Elizabeth =

1664 satire and recipe collection

The Court and Kitchin of Elizabeth is an anonymous satire of husband-and-wife Oliver and Elizabeth Cromwell, published by Thomas Milbourne in 1664. The satire is royalist in view, and closes with a large number of recipes that the text attributes to Elizabeth. In its full title, the book was called The Court and Kitchin of Elizabeth, Commonly Called Joan Cromwel the Wife of the Late Usurper.

Elizabeth is presented in the text as incompetent in her house managing duties, with parallels drawn between this and Elizabeth's and Oliver's perceived mismanagement of England during the Commonwealth period; the scholar Catherine Fields writes of the text's presentation of Elizabeth as a "perverted queen responsible for turning her house, as well as the government and country, into an upside-down dystopia." According to Fields, Milbourne was likely the book's author. The text of the satire was forceful, described in a book written primarily by Anne Willan as "vicious".

The recipes of second half of The Court and Kitchin of Elizabeth were drawn from a number of sources, including The Queens Closet Opened (1655). They instructed cooks how to make dishes such as buttered eggs, pie, and a red quince cake. The book's author writes of these: "most of them... common and vulgar".

Besides the text, the satire appears in the frontispiece, which contains a caricatured Elizabeth. She is pictured in a dark dress, with a white shawl draped over her shoulders and a hood over her hair. Over her shoulder appears a monkey, that Fields takes as a possible reference to the English proverb "The higher the monkey climbs, the more he shows his tail"—the higher Elizabeth ascended from her middle-class origins, the more her incompetence became apparent.

== Sources ==
- Field, Catherine (2006). "Many Hands Hands": Early Modern Englishwomen's Recipe Books and the Writing of Food, Politics, and the Self (PhD thesis). College Park, Maryland: University of Maryland, College Park.
- Lehmann, Gilly (2003). The British Housewife: Cookery Books, Cooking and Society in Eighteenth-Century Britain. Totnes, Devon: Prospect Books. ISBN 1-903018-04-8.
- Willan, Anne; Cherniavsky, Mark; Claflin, Kyri (2012). The Cookbook Library: Four Centuries of the Cooks, Writers, and Recipes That Made the Modern Cookbook. California Studies in Food and Culture. Berkeley, California: University of California Press. ISBN 978-0-520-24400-9.
