= Michael Bateman =

British journalist and author (1932–2006)

- Born: 25 March 1932; Richmond, London
- Died: 26 March 2006 (aged 74); London
- Occupations: author, journalist

Michael Bateman (25 March 1932 – 26 March 2006) was a British journalist and author best known for his writing and editing on food. He was an award-winning author and was described as groundbreaking by a former chairwoman of the Guild of Food Writers.

== Early life ==
The illegitimate son of a cabaret artiste Barbara Lunnon and Gerald Bateman, he was brought up by his grandparents in Littlehampton, Sussex. After rejoining his mother he attended Abingdon School from 1944 to 1951, where he was an all round sportsman playing for the first X1 cricket and hockey teams, the athletics team and the first XV rugby team. In addition he was a Prefect and was the runner-up in the Van Wagenen Essay Prize. Bateman did his national service before gaining an English scholarship at Pembroke College, Oxford.

== Career ==
It was during his time in the army posted in Hong Kong that he gained an interest in food. After marrying Jane Deverson in 1963 they went to live in Alicante before he found work as a journalist with the Westminster Press, Oxford Mail and Durham Advertiser and then Fleet Street. In 1967 he began work for The Sunday Times and became editor for the Lifespan section. He specialised in writing about food and wrote Cooking People in 1966, which gained national attention.

In 1981 he became editor for the Express magazine as food editor and in 1982 wrote The Sunday Times Book of Real Bread which increased national wholemeal bread consumption by 5%. This turned into a book called The Sunday Times Book of Real Bread. He wrote several other books and continued to write newspaper articles becoming an eminent and admired food writer. He was the food writer for The Independent on Sunday from 1990 and won many awards including the Glenfiddich Food Writer of the Year in 2000.

He died in 2006, three years after a car accident outside his home in Norfolk, which had caused complications. His collection of international cookery books and papers regarding his career are held Leeds University Library's Cookery Collection.

== Personal life ==
Michael married first Jane Deverson 1963 (sons Daniel and Paul; marriage dissolved), had son Simon and daughter Sarah with Vivien Tandy; married second 1978 children's author Heather Maisner (son Alex and daughter Georgia)

== Awards ==
2000 Food Writer of the Year

== Selected Books by Bateman ==
- Funny Way to Earn a Living, 1966 (pre ISBN)
- Cooking People, 1966 (pre ISBN)
- The World's Best Food, 1981 ISBN 9780091438906
- The Sunday Times Book of Real Bread, 1982 ISBN 9780878573684
- Round the World in Recipes, 1993 ISBN 9780340591550
- Street Cafe Brazil, 1999 ISBN 9780753716373
- The World of Spice, 2003 ISBN 9781856264723

== See also ==
- List of Old Abingdonians
