= Sarah Jinner =

Medical practitioner and almanac compiler

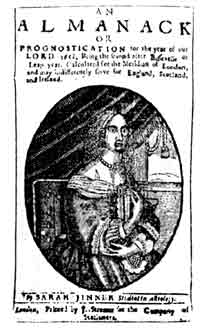
- 1658 almanac
- Occupation: writer
- Writing career
- Subject: women's medicine

Sarah Jinner (fl. 1658 – 1664) was an English compiler of almanacs and a medical practitioner. She is considered one of the first women to be a professional writer in what is now the United Kingdom.

== Life ==
The details of Jinner's life are largely unknown. She is thought to have been a supporter of the Royalists and she must have received some education. We know of her existence because annual almanacs that she wrote are extant. They were aimed at educated people and the medical subjects are biased towards women. The almanacs were published between 1658 and 1664.

Almanacs were one of the sources of medical advice and it was unusual to have a woman as the named author. Jinner's portrait is included as a woodcut and the books reveal her Royalist sympathies. The books are frank about women's medical issues and Jinner's confidence in women to cope with medical treatment. She is the first woman known to have written almanacs and she and Hannah Woolley are considered the first women professional writers. Their writings show the freedoms that were available during the Commonwealth and the Restoration of the monarchy. Within the almanac she replies to a letter and the accusation of Aristotle that women are just imperfect men. She notes that leading women like Elizabeth I show no sign of being imperfect men.

Her almanacs provide an insight into female sexuality and related public discussion. Jinner's book provides astrological advice about when, and when women should not, satisfy their desires. Her books describe physical symptoms and offered herbal remedies for treating gynaecological ailments. Her advice is drawn from two other publications available from the same publisher. Jinner advises wives on recipes that can be used as aphrodisiacs to encourage "fruitfulness" in men or women for the "comfort of man and women" and she hints at recipes to discreetly combat impotence.
