= Agostino Vespucci =

Florentine government clerk

- Born: Republic of Florence
- Other name: Augustinus Mathei Vespuccii
- Occupation: Government clerk
- Relatives: Amerigo Vespucci (cousin)

Agostino Vespucci (born Nettuci) was a Florentine chancellery official, clerk, and assistant to Niccolò Machiavelli, among others. He is most well known for helping to confirm the subject of Leonardo da Vinci's Mona Lisa as Lisa del Giocondo, and is also the author of a number of surviving letters and manuscripts.

== Mona Lisa ==
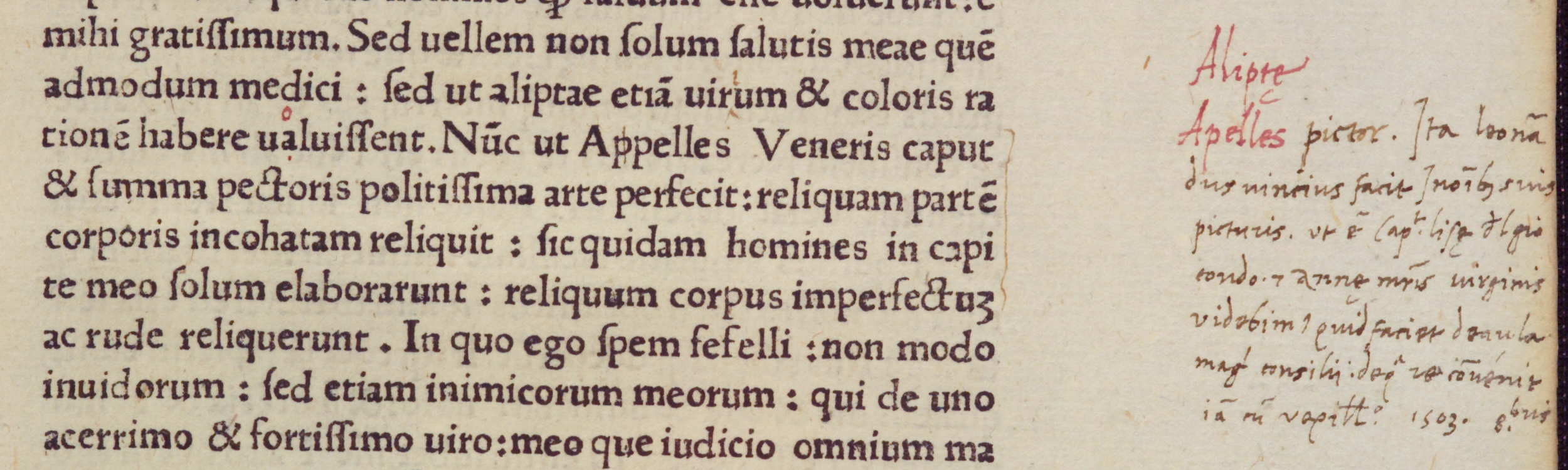
The note written by Vespucci in the right-hand margin refers to a specific passage of Cicero's letter.

The identity of the young woman in Leonardo's Mona Lisa had been difficult to ascertain due to a lack of decisive contemporary sources of information about the painting. This changed upon the discovery of a comment written by Vespucci in the margin of a 1477 edition of Cicero's Epistulae ad Familiares, now held by the Heidelberg University Library. The discovery was made by Armin Schlechter in 2005 while he was cataloguing the book for an incunabula exhibit at the library.

The unabbreviated Latin text of the note is as follows: Apelles pictor. Ita Leonardus Vincius facit in omnibus suis picturis, ut enim caput Lise del Giocondo et Anne matris virginis. Videbimus, quid faciet de aula magni consilii, de qua re convenit iam cum vexillifero. 1503 octobris. (English: "Apelles the painter. That is the way Leonardo da Vinci does it with all of his pictures, like, for example, with the countenance of Lisa del Giocondo and that of Anne, the mother of the Virgin. (Note: Around 1503, Leonardo painted The Virgin and Child with Saint Anne. He also made a cartoon of The Virgin and Child with Saint Anne and Saint John the Baptist, possibly by this date.) We will see how he is going to do it regarding the great council chamber, the thing which he has just come to terms about with the gonfaloniere. October 1503.")

In the comment, Vespucci notes a similarity of style between Leonardo and the renowned ancient Greek painter Apelles, in that both artists would first render the head and shoulders of subjects in extraordinary detail before continuing with the rest of the painting. As an example, Vespucci lists Leonardo's work on the portrait of "Lisa del Giocondo", and dates his comment "October 1503". The inclusion of the name and date allowed validation with a later known (but often unreliable) source published in 1550 and written by art historian Giorgio Vasari, who states that during this period Leonardo had taken a commission from Francesco del Giocondo to paint his wife, "Mona Lisa." Here Mona was not intended as a name but as an abbreviation of Madonna, the Italian literary form of Lady.
