= The Queens Closet Opened =

1655 manuscript collection

- Title page, 1st ed.
- Subject: Remedies, cookery
- Published: Nathaniel Brook
- Publication date: 1655
- Publication place: Cornhill, London
- Pages: 296

The Queens Closet Opened is a collection of manuscripts, first published in England in 1655. In its original edition, it comprised two sections: 'The Peal of Practise' (describing remedies) and 'A Queens Delight' (confectionery); a third section called 'The Compleat Cook' (cookery) was added in the second edition (1656).

The book is presented by a W. M., who claimed that the recipes had been prepared by Henrietta Maria, Queen of England, Scotland and Ireland. Identifying themselves as "one of her late servants". W. M. wrote that the book's contents were:

As they were presented to the Queen by the most Experienced Persons of our Times, many whereof were honoured with her own practice, when she pleased to descend to these more private Recreations. Never before published. Transcribed from the true Copies of her Majesties own Receipt Books.

According to the food historian Gilly Lehmann, the title's reference to the Queen was a reflection of attitudes towards the ideal housewife, with The Queens Closet Opened representing "an example of domestic virtue at the very highest level". The notion of these recipes being private was further evoked in the title's imagery of the closet, a highly personal space.

== Publication ==
The Queens Closet Opened was first published during the Commonwealth of England, an 11-year stretch of Republican governance. This period followed the English Civil War, a series of wars which took place during the reign of Charles I. In contrast to the instability of Charles' tenure when few cookbooks were published, the comparative stability of England under the Commonwealth allowed the publication of a number of books containing information on cookery. The Queens Closet Opened was among the best-selling of these. It was one of several recipe collections published in 1650s England that associated with nobility—A Choice Manual, for instance, the other most popular recipe collection of the era, did the same. In doing so, some scholars have argued books like The Queens Closet Opened served a political purpose as a reminder of royalty, producing associations between the good management of the home and country by Stuart monarchs.

The Queens Closet Opened remained among the bestselling books of the 1660s and 1670s, and by 1700, it had been through ten editions. New editions continued to be published until 1713.

== Remedies: The Peal of Practise ==
Books often included treatments for illnesses alongside recipes in the 17th century. One, named "A green oyntment good for Bruises, Swellings, and Wrenches in Man, Horse, or othr Beast." reads:

Take six pound of May Butter unsalted, Oyl Olive one quarter, Barrows-grease four pound, Rosin, and Turpentine, of each one pound, Frankincense half a pound: then take these following-Hearbs, of each one handful: Balm, Smallege, Lovage, Red Sage, Lavender, Cotton, Marjoram, Rosemary, Mallows, Cammomile, Plaintain, Alheal, Chickweed, Rue, Parsley, Comfrey, Laurel leaves, Birch leaves, Longwort, English Tobacco, Groundswel, Woundwort, Agrimony, Briony, Carduus Benedictus, Betony, Adders Tongue, Saint Johns-wort, pick all these, wash them clean, and strain the water clean of them.... For a man [to use] it must be well chafed in the Palme of the hand three or four times. If you use it for a Horse, put to it Brimstone finely beaten, and work it altogether, as aforesaid.'

This mixture was fermented, placed in "a Horse Dunghil one and twenty days." Its ingredients, ranging widely, drew from plants native to Europe, Asia, Africa, and the Americas.

== Cookery: The Compleat Cook ==
The Queens Closet Opened gained the section The Compleat Cook in its second edition, published in 1656.

The recipes contained in The Compleat Cook contained, for its time, a rather modern palate. The dishes contained less sugar than older recipes, and citrus juice and anchovies appeared often, flavours that would become prominent in English cookery following the Stuart Restoration. Dishes from English regional cooking appeared in baked goods, in recipes such as Banbury cake and Devonshire whitepot.

Recipes came from a range of non-English cuisines, including France, Spain, Italy, Turkey, Persia and Portugal. Some of its French recipes were drawn from The French Cook, a cookbook published in England in 1653 as a translation of François Pierre La Varenne's Le Cuisinier françois (1651). In turn, recipes from The Compleat Cook later appeared, uncredited, in The Court and Kitchin of Elizabeth, Commonly called Joan Cromwel (1664).

== Editions ==
- First Edition, Printed for Nathaniel Brook, at the Angel in Cornhill, 1655.
- London, Printed for Nathaniel Brook at the Angel in Cornhil, and William Place at Grays-Innegate, 1656.

== See also ==
- The Queen-Like Closet

== Sources ==
- Azevedo, Jillian (2017). Tastes of the Empire: Foreign Foods in Seventeenth Century England. Jefferson, North Carolina: McFarland & Company, Inc., Publishers. ISBN 978-1-4766-6862-8.
- Lehmann, Gilly (2003). The British Housewife: Cookery Books, Cooking and Society in Eighteenth-Century Britain. Totnes, Devon: Prospect Books. ISBN 1-903018-04-8.
- Leong, Elaine Yuen Tien (2018). Recipes and Everyday Knowledge: Medicine, Science, and the Household in Early Modern England. Chicago, Illinois & London: The University of Chicago Press. ISBN 978-0-226-58349-5.
- Stavely, Keith; Fitzgerald, Kathleen (2026). Northern Comfort: The New England Baking Tradition. New York University Press. ISBN 978-1-4798-4971-0.
