= The Queen-Like Closet =

1670 cookery book by Hannah Woolley

The Queen-like Closet, Or, Rich Cabinet
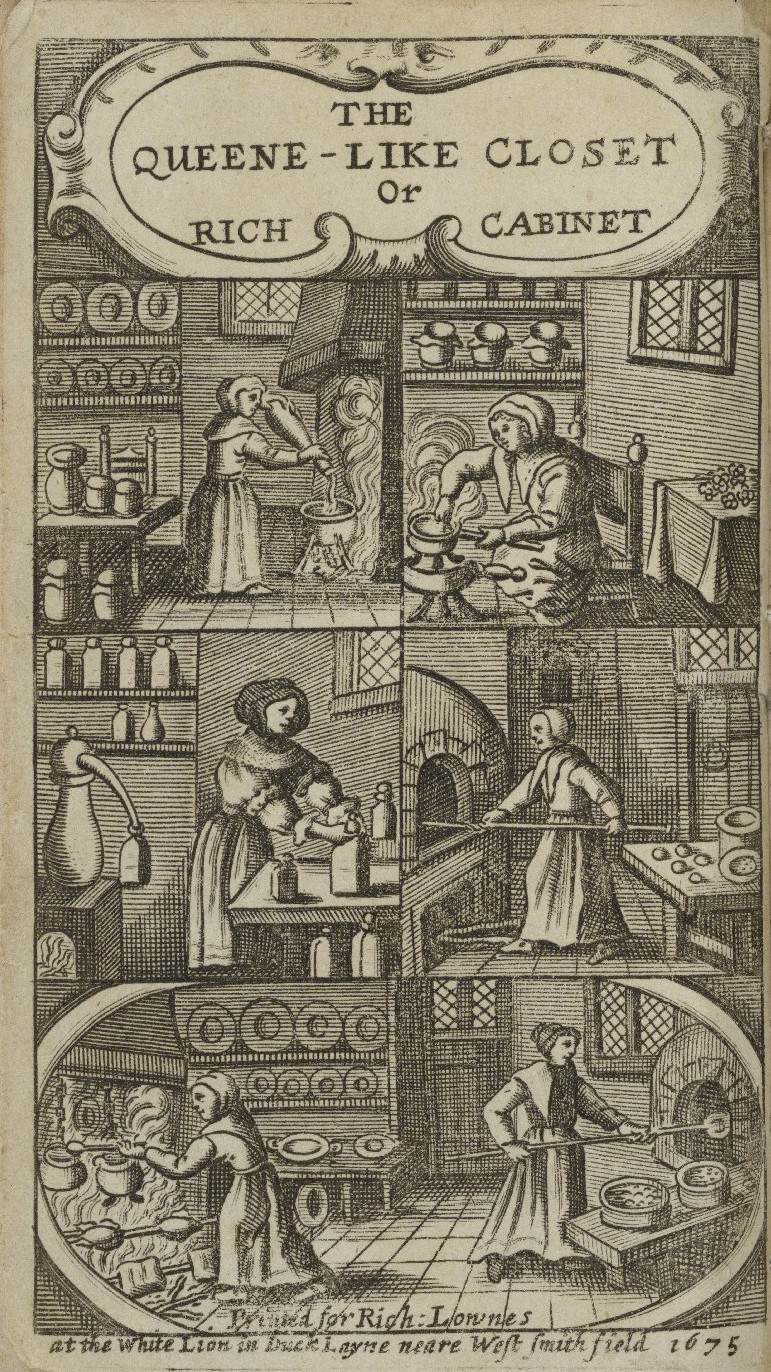
- Frontispiece
- Author: Hannah Woolley
- Subject: Cookery
- Publisher: Richard Lowndes
- Publication date: 1670
- Publication place: England
- Pages: 383

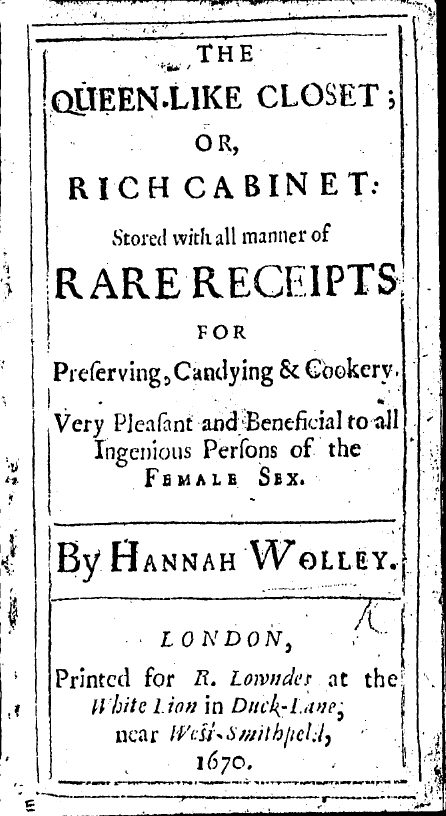
Title page of The Queen-Like Closet Or Rich Cabinet by Hannah Woolley, 1670

The Queen-like Closet, Or, Rich Cabinet was a cookery book published in 1670 by the English writer on household management, Hannah Woolley (Note: Her name was also spelt Hanna Wolley.) (1622 – c.1675). It ran through five English editions by 1684. At least two German editions were also printed.

The book provides a recipe for trifle, involving cream but no custard, a gooseberry fool, hot chocolate, and cheesecakes. Woolley's mince pies still contain meat as well as dried fruits. Ingredients include pumpkins and molasses from the New World.

The book contains the first known recipe for Sussex pond pudding.

== Context ==
Woolley had already published two books, The Ladies Directory in 1661 and The Cooks Guide in 1664. She was probably the first person to make her living by writing books on household management.

== Book ==
Richard Lowndes published Woolley's The Queen-Like Closet in 1670. The title is a reference to "W.M."'s 1655 book The Queens Closet Opened. The book is dedicated to Woolley's friend Mrs. Grace Buzby, daughter of Sir Henry Cary. Page 1 of the book, however, contradicts the title page by naming the book The Ladies New Closet. OR RATHER Rich Cabinet.

=== Approach ===
The book consists almost entirely of numbered recipes, prefaced only by Woolley's letter "To all Ladies, Gentlewomen, and to all other of the Female Sex who do delight in, or be desirous of good Accomplishments." and a one-page address "Ladies, I do here present you" in verse.

After the recipes are bills of fare (pages 353 to 369) for different times of the year, including "for extraordinary Feasts in the Summer", "for Winter Season", "for Lesser Feasts", "for Fish Days & Fasting Days in Ember week, or in Lent", "without feasting", "in Winter in Great Houses".

Woolley then describes (pages 378 to 383) the duties of each "office", including the cook, the "Maid under such a Cook", the butler, the carver, and other servants, and then "the Gentlewomen who have the Charge of the Sweet-Meats, and such like Repasts". Part 1 of the book describes the making of many such "Sweet-Meats".

The book ends with separate alphabetical indexes to parts one and two.

=== Illustrations ===
The book has no illustrations other than the frontispiece, which has six kitchen scenes, including a three-legged pot over an open fire, cordials being distilled, a bread oven, and pots and roasts on a spit over a fire, topped by a title medallion. It is inscribed "Printed for Rich. Lownes".

=== Contents ===
==== Part 1 ====
The 293 recipes in Part 1 are not grouped explicitly, but nos. 1 to 36 are for medicinal cordials and waters, such as "To get away the Signs of the Small Pox".

The following recipes are a mixture, with cakes, creams and puddings, medicines, preserves and wines in no discernible order. No. 58, a trifle, is made with boiled cream, rosewater, mace, and some rennet to help it set. No. 109 is a gooseberry fool made with gooseberries, water, sugar, egg yolks, cream, and nutmeg. Recipe 101, "To make Collops of Bacon in Sweet-meats" calls for Marchpane Paste, sugar, cinnamon, and ginger, sliced into escalopes as if it were bacon. The foods described are the sweet-meats which Woolley considered that her "Gentlewomen" readers would "have the Charge of".

Recipes involving meat appear with nos. 138 and 139, with "To make Christal Jelly" using knuckle of veal and calves feet, and "To make China-Broth" using "china", hartshorn, a "Red Cock cut in pieces and bruised", raisins and pearl barley.

Recipe 142 is "To make Chaculato", a hot chocolate drink made with claret, chocolate, egg yolk and sugar.

==== Part 2 ====
Part 2 is headed "The Second Part of the Queen-Like Closet; Having an Addition of what hath already been treated of, and directing a very true & excellent way for all manner of Cookery, both Fish, Flesh, & Pastry." It contains 288 recipes, and is ascribed to Hannah Wolley, alias Chaloner, and published by "R. L." in 1670.

Recipe 3 is the first for a main dish, "To make Coller'd Beef", the flank of beef being marinaded with saltpeter, spices and herbs, and then braised in a pot with claret and butter.

Recipe 6 is for cheesecakes, using milk, manchet to thicken it, butter, curd, currants, eggs, and a little cream and sugar, with pastry. More meat dishes follow from no. 18, a chicken pie, with recipes for brawn, pasties, and an elaborate "Olio" with a "fricasy" of calves head, oysters, anchovies, pigeons, bacon, sweetbreads, and veal.

Recipe 102 is for "Minced Pies", the filling inside the pastry being made with veal and suet in equal amounts, with dried fruits (raisins, currants, prunes, and dates), spices, verjuice and sugar.

Recipes 113 to 121 are for fish dishes, starting with "a Fricasie of Oisters".

Recipe 132 is for "Pumpion-Pie", the pumpkin being fried with beaten egg and then baked in slices in a pie crust with dried fruits, butter, sack, and "some sharp apples".

Recipes 144 to 157 are for meat or fish pies. Recipe 261 is for a "Haggus Pudding".

Recipe 285 is for "Vin de Molosso, or Treacle Wine", calling for "Molossoes" (Note: Imported from the West Indies.) boiled with spices and rosemary, then brewed "as you do Beer".

=== Editions ===
Five English editions are recorded:

- 1670 – First edition. Richard Lowndes
- 1672 – Second edition. Richard Lowndes

- 1674 – A Supplement to the "Queen-Like Closet," or, A Little of Every Thing

- 1675 – Third edition. Richard Lowndes
- 1681 – Fourth edition. R. Chiswel and T. Sawbridge
- 1684 – Fifth edition. R. Chiswel and T. Sawbridge

At least two editions of a German translation were published as Frauenzimmers Zeitvertreib.

== Reception ==
The historian Wendy Wall describes Woolley as "a domestic female celebrity who acted as the Martha Stewart of the seventeenth century." Wall argues that Woolley's cookery books including The Ladies Directory in Choice Experiments (1662) and The Cook's Guide (1664) as well as The Queen-Like Closet and its supplement are part of a rags-to-riches tale in which "domestic expertise" offered social mobility.

The essayist Charles Lamb wrote that he found a copy of the Queen-Like Closet in a bookstall: "I lit upon a ragged duodecimo, which had been the strange delight of my infancy, and which I had lost sight of for more than forty years ... being an abstract of receipts in cookery, confectionery, cosmetics, needlework, morality, and all such branches of what were then considered as female accomplishments."

Kate Colquhoun notes that Woolley "addressed servants for the first time" in her books, focussing on practicality and economy. She argues that Woolley succeeded best by recognising that people "wanted to offer upmarket, modern dishes on a constrained budget." She brought fashionable ingredients like anchovies, capers and wine into her simplified dishes, with frugal advice on reusing leftovers. Colquhoun however criticises her organisation:

Although she set out to simplify, the disordered arrangement of Woolley's books, in which pickled cucumbers appeared next to orange pudding, was a far cry from the model of clarity presented by May

But, Colquhoun concludes, Woolley was "a fine, solid cook" who was prepared to roast woodcock "The French Way" however much she disliked the show of "some rare whimsical French cook", using bacon over the bird's breast and serving it on toast. And her bills of fare were "carefully detailed" with "a buttered apple pie, an almond custard or a syllabub – the dessert of the age."

== See also ==
- A Collection of above Three Hundred Receipts in Cookery, Physick and Surgery
- The Good Huswifes Jewell
