= Hannah Woolley =

English writer (c.1622 – in or after 1675)

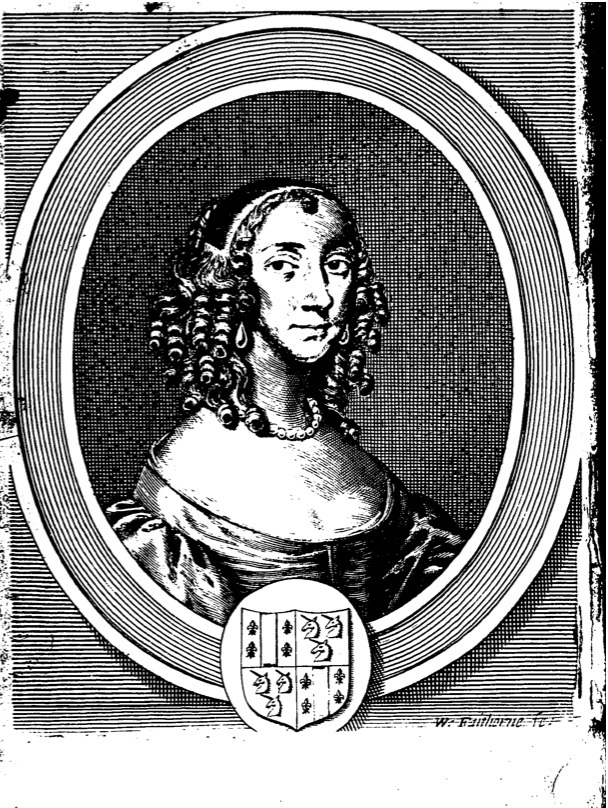
Hannah Woolley, as depicted on the frontispiece of The Gentlewoman's Companion; or, a Guide to the Female Sex, published 1673. Since this was an unauthorised publication of her work the likeness is questionable.

Hannah Woolley, sometimes spelled Wolley (c.1622 – in or after 1675), was an English writer who published early books on household management; she was probably the first person to earn a living doing this.

She variously worked as a servant, and as a grammar school teacher. Her husband was a schoolmaster. The couple first opened their own school in Newport, then a second school in Hackney. Following her husband's death, she became a professional writer. She also earned a reputation as a successful physician, despite her amateur status.

== Life ==
Her mother and elder sisters were all skilled in "Physick and Chirurgery" and she learned from them. Nothing is known of her father.

From 1639 to 1646 Woolley worked as a servant for an unnamed woman, almost certainly Anne, Lady Maynard (d. 1647), during which time she learned about medical remedies and recipes. She married Jerome Woolley, a schoolmaster, in 1646 and together with him ran a free grammar school at Newport, in Essex. This is very near the Maynard family's house at Little Easton. In the school she put into practice her skills at "physick". A few years later, the Woolleys opened a school in Hackney, London. She had at least four sons and two daughters, and the marriage was remembered by Hannah as a happy one.

She was widowed in 1661 and from that year on began publishing books on household management. She covered such topics as recipes, notes on domestic management, embroidery instruction, the etiquette of letter writing, medicinal advice, and perfume making. These proved to be very popular. Her first book, The Ladies Directory, was published at her own expense in 1661, and this was soon reprinted in 1664. Her second book, The Cooks Guide, was printed at her publisher's expense and is dedicated to Maynard's daughter, Lady Anne Wroth (1632–1677), and her own daughter, Mary. Woolley and almanac writer Sarah Jinner are considered to be the first women professional writers. Their writings show the freedoms that were available during the English Commonwealth and the Stuart Restoration.

Woolley earned a reputation as a successful physician, despite her amateur status and the unwelcoming environment for female medical practitioners at that time in history. She used her books as an advertisement for her skills, and invited her readers to consult her in person.

She remarried in 1666 at St. Margaret's, Westminster, to Francis Challiner, a widower two years older than herself, but he died before February 1669. Her date of death is unknown. She did not react, as she had done previously, to another plagiarised work of 1675 called The Accomplish'd Ladies Delight, so it is likely that she did not live to see it appear.

== Works ==
- 1661 – The Ladies Directory
- 1664 – The Cooks Guide
- 1670 – The Queen-Like Closet; at least two editions of a German translation were published as Frauenzimmers Zeitvertreib.
- 1672 – The Ladies Delight
- 1674 – A Supplement to the "Queen-Like Closet," or, A Little of Every Thing

An unauthorised work based on her books was published in 1673 as The Gentlewoman's Companion.

Similar unauthorised works followed: in 1675 The Accomplished Ladies Delight, and in 1685 The Compleat Servant-Maid. Like her authentic works, these were reprinted frequently. There has been little critical discussion about Woolley until recently, and scholarly writing on her works remains quite limited. Most academic conversations concerning Woolley focus primarily on her position as a female in a traditionally male market and her opinion on women's education. However, recent publications suggest that future discussion of Woolley may expand to include conversations about the fluidity of authorship during the 17th century and the shifting definition of authorial ownership.

== Sources ==
- "Hannah Woolley b. 1623, England; d. circa 1675, England". Dinner Party Database of notable women. Brooklyn Museum. 20 March 2007.
- Ellison, Katherine (2005). "Introduction to The Gentlewomans Companion". Emory Women Writers Resource Project. Emory University. Archived from the original on 11 June 2010.
- Hobby, Elaine (1988). Virtue of Necessity: English Women's Writing, 1646–1688. London: Virago Press.
- Considine, John; Wolley, Hannah (b. 1622?, d. in or after 1674), Oxford Dictionary of National Biography, Oxford University Press, 2004 accessed 23 September 2009
- Chedgzoy, Kate, Melanie Osborne, and Suzanne Trill, eds. "Lay By Your Needles Ladies, Take the Pen": Writing Women in England, 1500–1700. London and New York: Arnold, 1997 ISBN 0-340-61450-1.
- Ferguson, Moira, ed. First Feminists: British Women Writers, 1578–1799. Bloomington: Indiana University Press, 1985.
- Poole, Kristen. "The fittest closet for all goodness: authorial strategies of Jacobean mothers manuals". SEL: Studies in English Literature 1500–1900; vol. 35 (1995): 69–88.
- Raftery, Deirdre. Women and Learning in English Writing, 1600–1900. Portland: Four Courts Press, 1997.
