= Brontë family =

19th-century English literary family

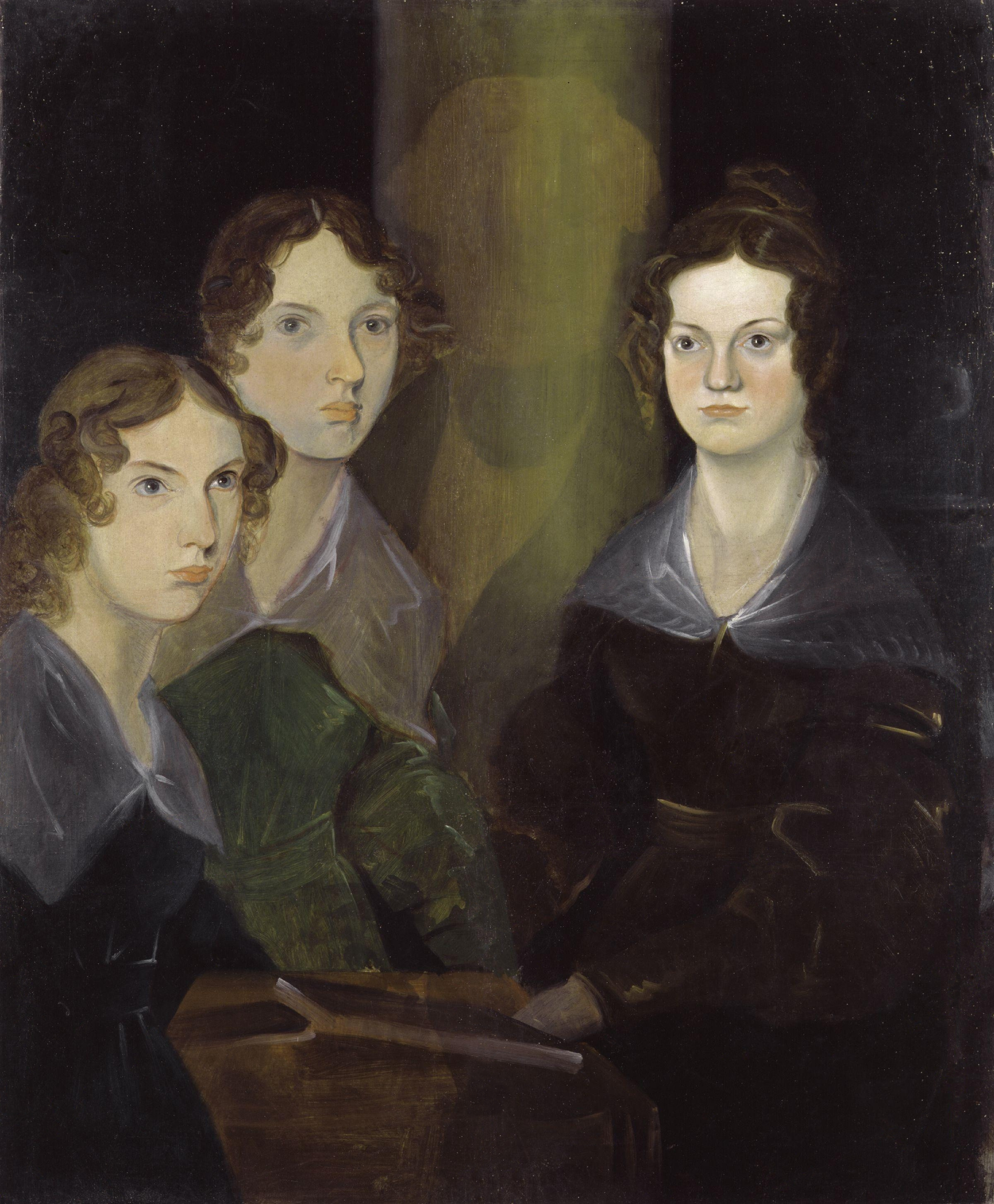
Anne, Emily and Charlotte Brontë, by their brother Branwell (c. 1834). He painted himself among his sisters, but later removed his image so as not to clutter the picture. National Portrait Gallery, London

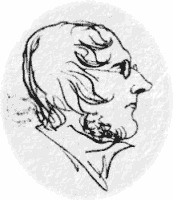
Branwell Brontë, self-portrait, 1840

The Brontës (/ˈbrɒntiz/) were a 19th-century literary family, born in the village of Thornton and later associated with the village of Haworth in the West Riding of Yorkshire, England. Born to Patrick Brontë, a curate, and his wife, Maria, the sisters Charlotte (1816–1855), Emily (1818–1848) and Anne (1820–1849) were all poets and novelists who published their work under male pseudonyms: Currer, Ellis, and Acton Bell respectively. Their stories attracted attention for their passion and originality immediately following their publication. Charlotte's Jane Eyre was the first to know success, while Emily's Wuthering Heights, Anne's Agnes Grey and other works were accepted as masterpieces of literature after their deaths.

The two eldest Brontë children were Maria (1814–1825) and Elizabeth (1815–1825), who both died at an early age. The three surviving sisters and their brother, Branwell (1817–1848) were very close. As children, they developed their imaginations first through oral storytelling and play, set in an intricate imaginary world, and then through the collaborative writing of increasingly complex stories set in their fictional world. Mary Shelley's dystopian novel The Last Man and poet Percy Shelley have been shown to have had an impact on their juvenile work. The early deaths of their mother and two older sisters marked them and profoundly influenced their writing. They were raised in a religious family. The Brontë birthplace in Thornton is a place of pilgrimage for their admirers, and their later home, the parsonage at Haworth in Yorkshire, now the Brontë Parsonage Museum, annually receives hundreds of thousands of visitors.

== Origin of the name ==
At some point, Patrick Brontë (born Brunty), the sisters' father, decided on the alternative spelling with the diaeresis over the terminal ⟨e⟩ to indicate that the name has two syllables. Initially, there was little certainty about which mark, if any, adorned the letter e. Multiple theories exist to account for the change, including that he may have wished to hide his humble origins. As a man of letters, he would have been familiar with classical Greek and may have chosen the name after Ancient Greek βροντή (transl. thunder). One view, which the biographer Clement Shorter proposed in 1896, is that he adapted his name to associate himself with Admiral Horatio Nelson, who was also Duke of Bronte. The title was typically spelled without a diacritical mark — as in most English sources and the Italian language — but sometimes it was, as in some Nelson biographies and Arbëresh (one of the languages spoken in the eponymous town of Bronte in Sicily at that time). The spelling Bronté was also used by some biographers, and is also found in Branwell Brontë's long poem about Nelson, Bronté.

== Family tree ==
Hugh Brunty	Alice McClory	Anne Carne	Thomas Branwell	Jane Branwell	John Fennell
Patrick Brontë; 1777–1861	Maria Branwell; 1783–1821	Elizabeth Branwell; 1776–1842	Jane Branwell	John Kingston; 1769–1824	Jane Branwell Fennell; 1791–1827	William Morgan; 1782–1858
Maria Brontë; 1814–1825	Elizabeth Brontë; 1815–1825	Arthur Bell Nicholls; 1819–1906	Charlotte Brontë; 1816–1855	Branwell Brontë; 1817–1848	Emily Brontë; 1818–1848	Anne Brontë; 1820–1849

== Members of the Brontë family ==
=== Patrick Brontë ===
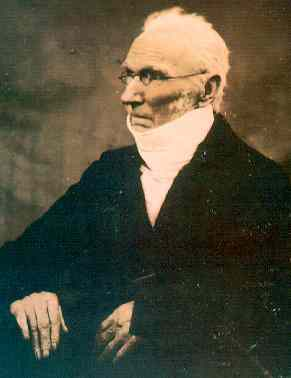
Portrait of Patrick Brontë around 1860

Patrick Brontë (17 March 1777 – 7 June 1861), the Brontë sisters' father, was born in Loughbrickland, County Down, Ireland, of a family of farm workers of moderate means. His birth name was Patrick Prunty or Brunty. His mother, Alice McClory, was of the Roman Catholic faith, while his father, Hugh, was a Protestant, and Patrick was brought up in his father's faith.

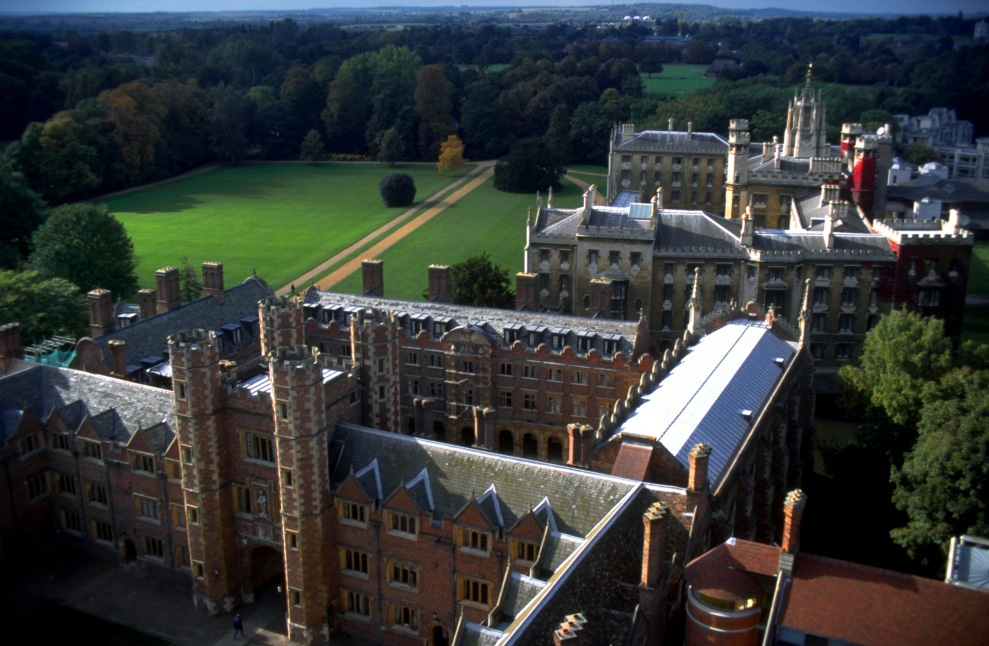
View of St John's College, Cambridge, where Patrick Brontë was a student

He was a bright young man and, after studying under the Rev. Thomas Tighe, won a scholarship to St John's College, Cambridge. There, he studied divinity, ancient history and modern history. Attending Cambridge may have made him feel that his name was too Irish and he changed its spelling to Brontë (and its pronunciation accordingly), perhaps in honour of Horatio Nelson, whom Patrick admired. It is also possible that his brother William had fallen foul of the authorities for his involvement with the radical United Irishmen, leading Patrick to distance himself from the name Brunty. Having obtained a Bachelor of Arts degree, he was ordained on 10 August 1806. He is the author of Cottage Poems (1811), The Rural Minstrel (1814), numerous pamphlets, several newspaper articles and various rural poems.

In 1811 Patrick was appointed minister at Hartshead-cum-Clifton. In 1812, he met and married 29-year-old Maria Branwell at Guiseley. In 1813, they moved to Clough House Hightown, Liversedge, West Riding of Yorkshire, and by 1820 they had moved into the parsonage at Haworth, where he took up the post of perpetual curate. (Haworth was an ancient chapelry in the large parish of Bradford, so he could not be rector or vicar.) They had six children. On the death of his wife in 1821, his sister-in-law, Elizabeth Branwell, came from Penzance, Cornwall, to help him bring up the children. Open, intelligent, generous and dedicated to educating his children personally, he bought all the books and toys the children desired. He also accorded them great freedom and unconditional love, although Elizabeth Gaskell suggests in her biography of Charlotte Brontë that he may also have alienated them from the world due to his eccentric personal habits and peculiar theories of education.

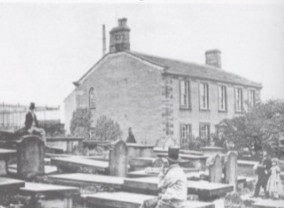
Haworth parsonage soon after Patrick Brontë's death

After several failed attempts to remarry, Patrick accepted permanent widowerhood at the age of 47, and spent his time visiting the sick and the poor, giving sermons and administering communion. In so doing, he would often leave his children Maria, Elizabeth, Emily, Charlotte, Branwell and Anne alone with Elizabeth—Aunt Branwell and a maid, Tabitha Aykroyd (Tabby). Tabby helped relieve their possible boredom and loneliness especially by recounting local legends in her Yorkshire dialect as she tirelessly prepared the family's meals. Eventually, Patrick would survive his entire family. Six years after Charlotte's death, he died in 1861 at the age of 84. His son-in-law, the Rev. Arthur Bell Nicholls, would aid Mr Brontë at the end of his life as well.

=== Maria, née Branwell ===
Patrick's wife Maria Brontë, née Branwell (15 April 1783 – 15 September 1821), was born in Penzance, Cornwall, and came from a comfortably well-off, middle-class family. Her father had a flourishing tea and grocery store and had accumulated considerable wealth. Maria died at the age of 38 of uterine cancer. She married the same day as her younger sister Charlotte in the church at Guiseley after her fiancé had celebrated the union of two other couples. She was a literate and pious woman, known for her lively spirit, joyfulness and tenderness, and it was she who designed the samplers that are on display in the Brontë Parsonage museum and had them embroidered by her children. She left memories with her husband and with Charlotte, the oldest surviving sibling, of a very vivacious woman. The younger ones, particularly Emily and Anne, admitted to retaining only vague images of their mother, especially of her suffering on her sickbed.

=== Elizabeth Branwell ===
Elizabeth Branwell (2 December 1776 – 29 October 1842) arrived from Penzance in 1821, aged 45, after her younger sister Maria's death, to help Patrick look after the children, to whom she was known as 'Aunt Branwell.' Elizabeth Branwell was a Methodist, though it seems that her denomination did not exert any influence on the children. It was Aunt Branwell who taught the children arithmetic, the alphabet, and how to sew, embroider and cross-stitch, skills appropriate for ladies. Aunt Branwell also gave them books and subscribed to Fraser's Magazine, less interesting than Blackwood's, but, nevertheless, providing plenty of material for discussion. She was a generous person who dedicated her life to her nieces and nephew, neither marrying nor returning to visit her relations in Cornwall. She probably told the children stories of events that had happened in Cornwall, such as raids by pirates in the eighteenth century, who carried off British residents to be enslaved in North Africa and Turkey; enslavement in Turkey is mentioned by Charlotte Brontë in Jane Eyre. She died of bowel obstruction in October 1842, after a brief agony during which she was comforted by her beloved nephew Branwell. In her last will, Aunt Branwell left to her three nieces the considerable sum of £900 (about £95,700 in 2017 currency), which allowed them to resign from their low-paid jobs as governesses and teachers.

=== Children ===
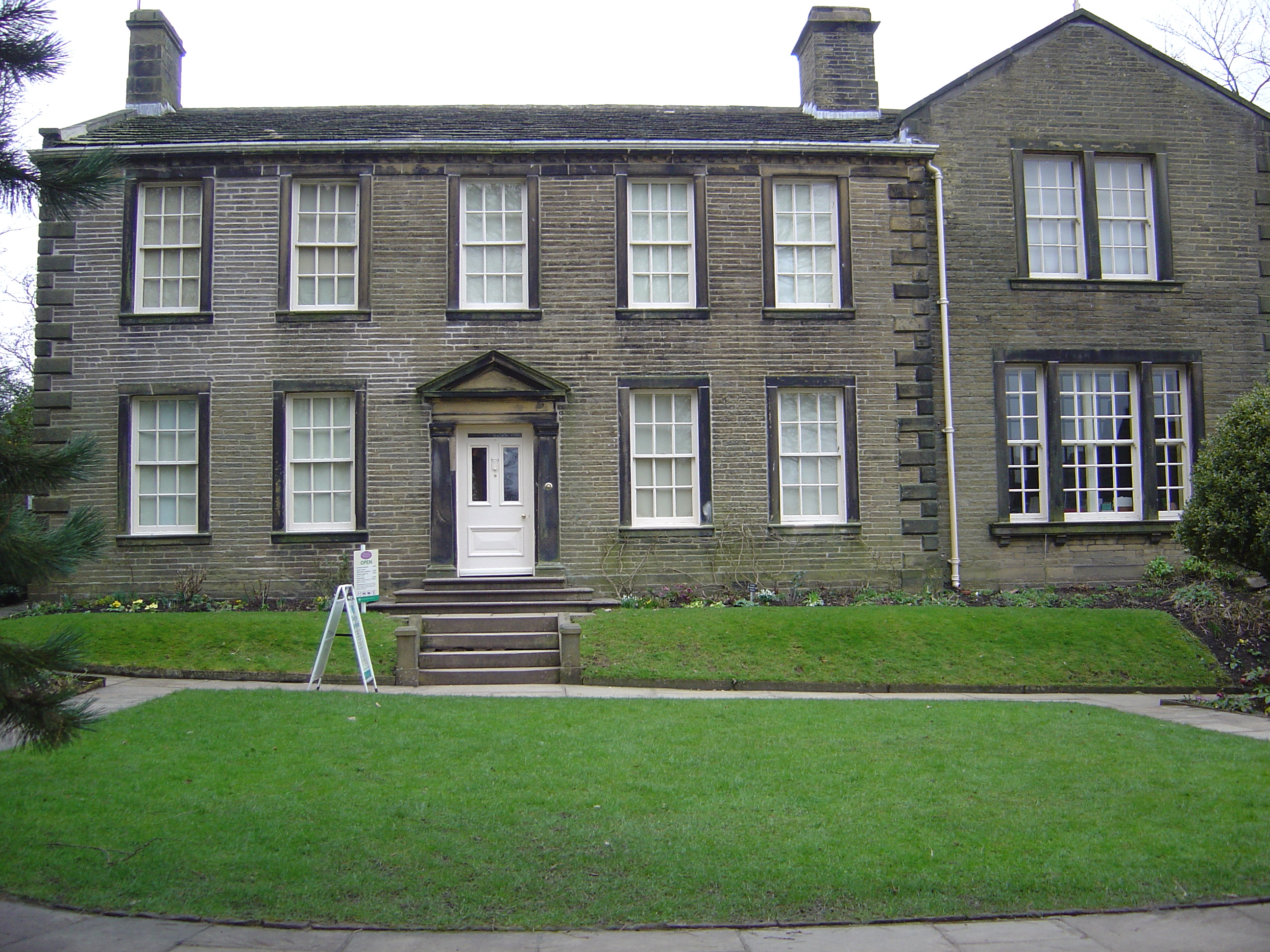
The parsonage in Haworth, the former family home, is now the Brontë Parsonage Museum.

- Maria (1814–1825), the eldest, was born in Clough House, Hightown, Liversedge, West Yorkshire, on 23 April 1814. She suffered from hunger, cold, and privation at Cowan Bridge School. Charlotte described her as very lively, very sensitive, and particularly advanced in her reading. She returned from school with an advanced case of tuberculosis and died at Haworth aged 11 on 6 May 1825.
- Elizabeth (1815–1825), the second child, joined her sister Maria at Cowan Bridge where she suffered the same fate. Elizabeth was less vivacious than her sisters and brother and apparently less advanced for her age. She died on 15 June 1825 aged 10, within two weeks of returning home to her father.
- Charlotte (1816–1855), born in Market Street, Thornton, near Bradford, West Riding of Yorkshire, on 21 April 1816, was a poet and novelist and was the author of Jane Eyre, her best-known work, as well as Shirley, Villette, and The Professor. She died on 31 March 1855, aged 38.
- Patrick Branwell (1817–1848) was born in Market Street, Thornton on 26 June 1817. Known as Branwell, he was a painter, writer, and casual worker. He became addicted to alcohol and laudanum and died in Haworth on 24 September 1848, aged 31.
- Emily Jane (1818–1848), born in Market Street, Thornton, 30 July 1818, was a poet and novelist. She died in Haworth on 19 December 1848, aged 30. Wuthering Heights was her only novel.
- Anne (1820–1849), born in Market Street, Thornton on 17 January 1820, was a poet and novelist. She wrote a largely autobiographical novel entitled Agnes Grey, but her second novel, The Tenant of Wildfell Hall (1848), was far more ambitious. She died on 28 May 1849 in Scarborough, aged 29.

== Education ==
=== Cowan Bridge School ===
In 1824 the four eldest girls (excluding Anne) entered the Clergy Daughters' School at Cowan Bridge, which educated the children of less prosperous members of the clergy, and had been recommended to Mr Brontë. The following year, Maria and Elizabeth fell gravely ill and were removed from the school, later dying on 6 May and 15 June 1825, respectively. Charlotte and Emily were also withdrawn from the school and returned to Haworth. Charlotte expressed the traumatic impact that her sisters' deaths had on her in her future works. In Jane Eyre, Cowan Bridge became Lowood, Maria inspired the young Helen Burns, the cruel mistress Miss Andrews inspired the headmistress Miss Scatcherd, and the tyrannical headmaster Rev. Carus Wilson, Mr Brocklehurst.

Tuberculosis, which afflicted Maria and Elizabeth in 1825, also caused the eventual deaths of three of the surviving Brontës: Branwell in September 1848, Emily in December 1848, and, finally, Anne in May 1849.

Patrick Brontë faced a challenge in arranging for the education of the girls of his family, which was barely middle class. They lacked significant connections and he could not afford the fees for them to attend an established school for young ladies. One solution was the schools where the fees were reduced to a minimum—so called "charity schools"—with a mission to assist families like those of the lower clergy.

(Barker had read in the Leeds Intelligencer of 6 November 1823 reports of cases in the Court of Commons in Bowes: he later read of other cases, of 24 November 1824 near Richmond, in the county of Yorkshire, where pupils had been discovered gnawed by rats and suffering so badly from malnutrition that some of them had lost their sight.) Yet for Patrick, there was nothing to suggest that the Reverend Carus Wilson's Clergy Daughters' School would not provide a good education and good care for his daughters. The school was not expensive and its patrons (supporters who allowed the school to use their names) were all respected people. Among these was the daughter of Hannah More, a religious author and philanthropist who took a particular interest in education. More was a close friend of the poet William Cowper, who, like her, advocated extensive, proper and well-rounded education for young girls. The pupils included the offspring of different prelates and even certain acquaintances of Patrick Brontë including William Wilberforce, young women whose fathers had also been educated at St John's College, Cambridge. Thus Brontë believed Wilson's school to have many of the necessary guarantees needed for his daughters to receive proper schooling.

=== John Bradley ===
In 1829–30, Patrick Brontë engaged John Bradley, an artist from neighbouring Keighley, as drawing-master for the children. Bradley was an artist of some local repute rather than a professional instructor, but he may well have fostered Branwell's enthusiasm for art and architecture.

=== Miss Wooler's school ===
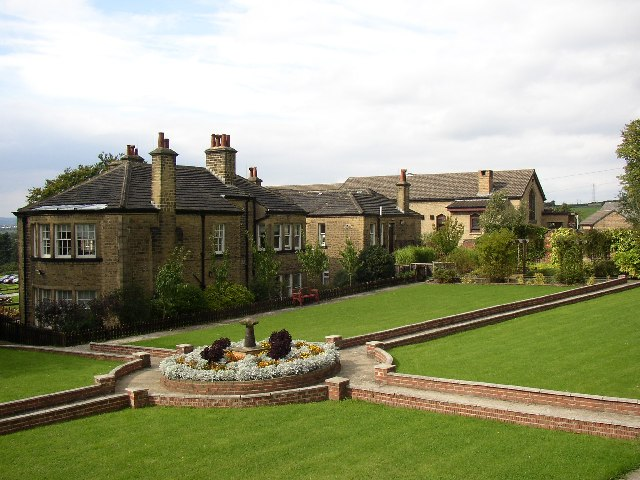
Roe Head, Mirfield, Miss Wooler's school

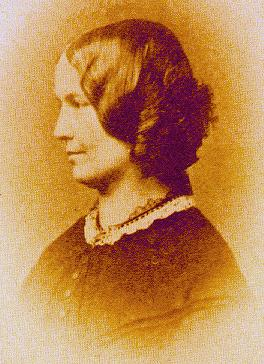
Disputed photograph taken about 1855; sources are in disagreement over whether this image is of Charlotte Brontë or of her friend, Ellen Nussey.

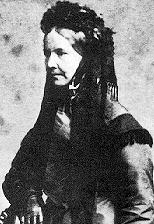
Ellen Nussey around 1855, at the time of the death of Charlotte

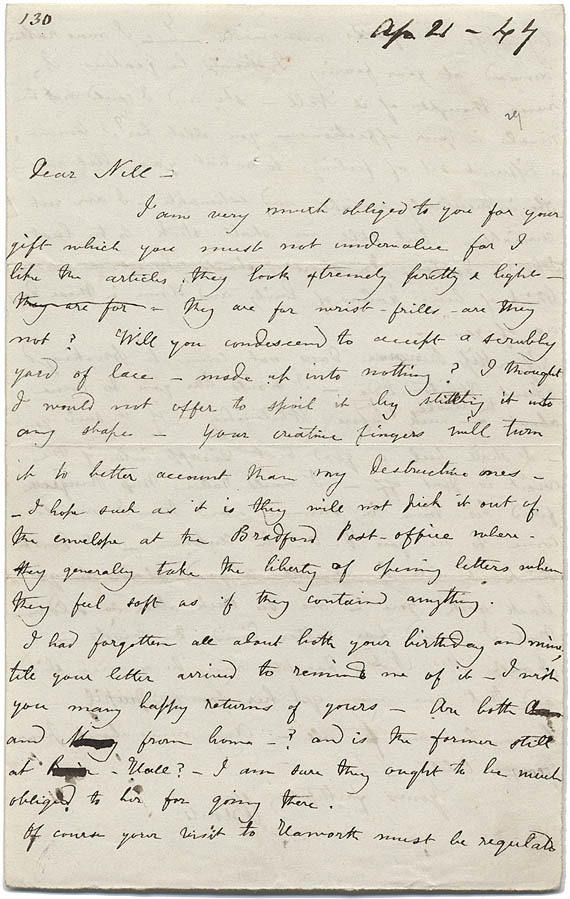
A letter from Charlotte Brontë to her friend, Ellen Nussey (Note: In this letter dated 21 April 1844, the day of her 28th birthday, she thanks her friend Nell for the gift, returns the gesture by sending her some lace: "I hope", she adds, "they will not peck it out of the envelope at the Bradford Post-office, where they generally take the liberty of opening letters when they feel soft as if they contained articles".)

In 1831 fourteen-year-old Charlotte was enrolled at the school of Miss Wooler in Roe Head, Mirfield. Patrick could have sent his daughter to a less costly school in Keighley nearer home but Miss Wooler and her sisters had a good reputation and he remembered the building, which he passed when strolling around the parishes of Kirklees, Dewsbury and Hartshead-cum-Clifton where he was vicar. Margaret Wooler showed fondness towards the sisters and she accompanied Charlotte to the altar at her marriage. Patrick's choice of school was excellent—Charlotte was happy there and studied well. She made many lifelong friends, in particular Ellen Nussey and Mary Taylor who later went to New Zealand before returning to England. Charlotte returned from Roe Head in June 1832, missing her friends, but happy to rejoin her family.

Three years later, Miss Wooler offered her former pupil a position as her assistant. The family decided that Emily would accompany her to pursue studies that would otherwise have been unaffordable. Emily's fees were partly covered by Charlotte's salary. Emily was 17 and it was the first time she had left Haworth since leaving Cowan Bridge. On 29 July 1835 the sisters left for Roe Head. The same day, Branwell wrote a letter to the Royal Academy of Art in London, to present several of his drawings as part of his candidature as a probationary student.

Charlotte taught, and wrote about her students without much sympathy. Emily did not settle: after three months her health seemed to decline and she had to be taken home to the parsonage. Anne took her place and stayed until Christmas 1837.

Charlotte avoided boredom by following the developments of the imaginary Empire of Angria—invented by Charlotte and Branwell—that she received in letters from her brother. During holidays at Haworth, she wrote long narratives while being reproached by her father who wanted her to become more involved in parish affairs. These were coming to a head over the imposition of the Church of England rates, a local tax levied on parishes where the majority of the population were dissenters. In the meantime, Miss Wooler moved to Heald's House, at Dewsbury Moor, where Charlotte complained about the humidity that made her unwell. Upon leaving the establishment in 1838 Miss Wooler presented her with a parting gift of The Vision of Don Roderick and Rokeby, a collection of poems by Walter Scott.

== Literary evolution ==
The children became interested in writing from an early age, initially as a game. They all displayed a talent for narrative, but for the younger ones it became a pastime to develop them. At the centre of the children's creativity were twelve wooden soldiers which Patrick Brontë gave to Branwell at the beginning of June 1826. These toy soldiers instantly fired their imaginations and they spoke of them as the Young Men, and gave them names. However, it was not until December 1827 that their ideas took written form, and the imaginary African kingdom of Glass Town came into existence, followed by the Empire of Angria. Emily and Anne created Gondal, an island continent in the North Pacific, ruled by a woman, after the departure of Charlotte in 1831. In the beginning, these stories were written in little books, the size of a matchbox about 1.5 by 2.5 inches (38 mm × 64 mm) and cursorily bound with thread. The pages were filled with close, minute writing, often in capital letters without punctuation and embellished with illustrations, detailed maps, schemes, landscapes and plans of buildings, created by the children according to their specialisations. The idea was that the books were of a size for the soldiers to read. The complexity of the stories matured as the children's imaginations developed, fed by reading the three weekly or monthly magazines to which their father had subscribed, or the newspapers that were bought daily from John Greenwood's local news and stationery store.

=== Literary and artistic influence ===
These fictional worlds were the product of imagination fed by reading, discussion and a passion for literature. Far from suffering from the negative influences that never left them and which were reflected in the works of their later, more mature years, the Brontë children absorbed them.

==== Press ====
The periodicals that Patrick Brontë read were a mine of information for his children. The Leeds Intelligencer and Blackwood's Edinburgh Magazine, conservative and well written, but better than the Quarterly Review that defended the same political ideas whilst addressing a less-refined readership (the reason Patrick did not read it), were exploited in every detail. Blackwood's Magazine, in particular, was not only the source of their knowledge of world affairs, but also provided material for the Brontës' early writing. For instance, an article in the June 1826 number of Blackwood's, provides commentary on new discoveries from the exploration of central Africa. The map included with the article highlights geographical features the Brontës reference in their tales: the Jibbel Kumera (the Mountains of the Moon), Ashantee, and the rivers Niger and Calabar. The author also advises the British to expand into Africa from Fernando Po, where, Christine Alexander notes, the Brontë children locate the Great Glass Town. Their knowledge of geography was completed by Goldsmith's Grammar of General Geography, which the Brontës owned and annotated heavily.

==== Lord Byron ====
From 1833, Charlotte and Branwell's Angrian tales begin to feature Byronic heroes who have a strong sexual magnetism and passionate spirit, and demonstrate arrogance and even black-heartedness. Again, it is in an article in Blackwood's Magazine from August 1825 that they discover the poet for the first time; he had died the previous year. From this moment, the name Byron became synonymous with all the prohibitions and audacities as if it had stirred up the very essence of the rise of those forbidden things. Branwell's Charlotte Zamorna, one of the heroes of Verdopolis, tends towards increasingly ambiguous behaviour, and the same influence and evolution recur with the Brontës, especially in the characters of Heathcliff in Wuthering Heights, and Mr. Rochester in Jane Eyre, who display the traits of a Byronic hero. Numerous other works left their mark on the Brontës—the Thousand and One Nights, for example, which inspired jinn in which they became themselves in the centre of their kingdoms, while adding a touch of exoticism.

==== John Martin ====
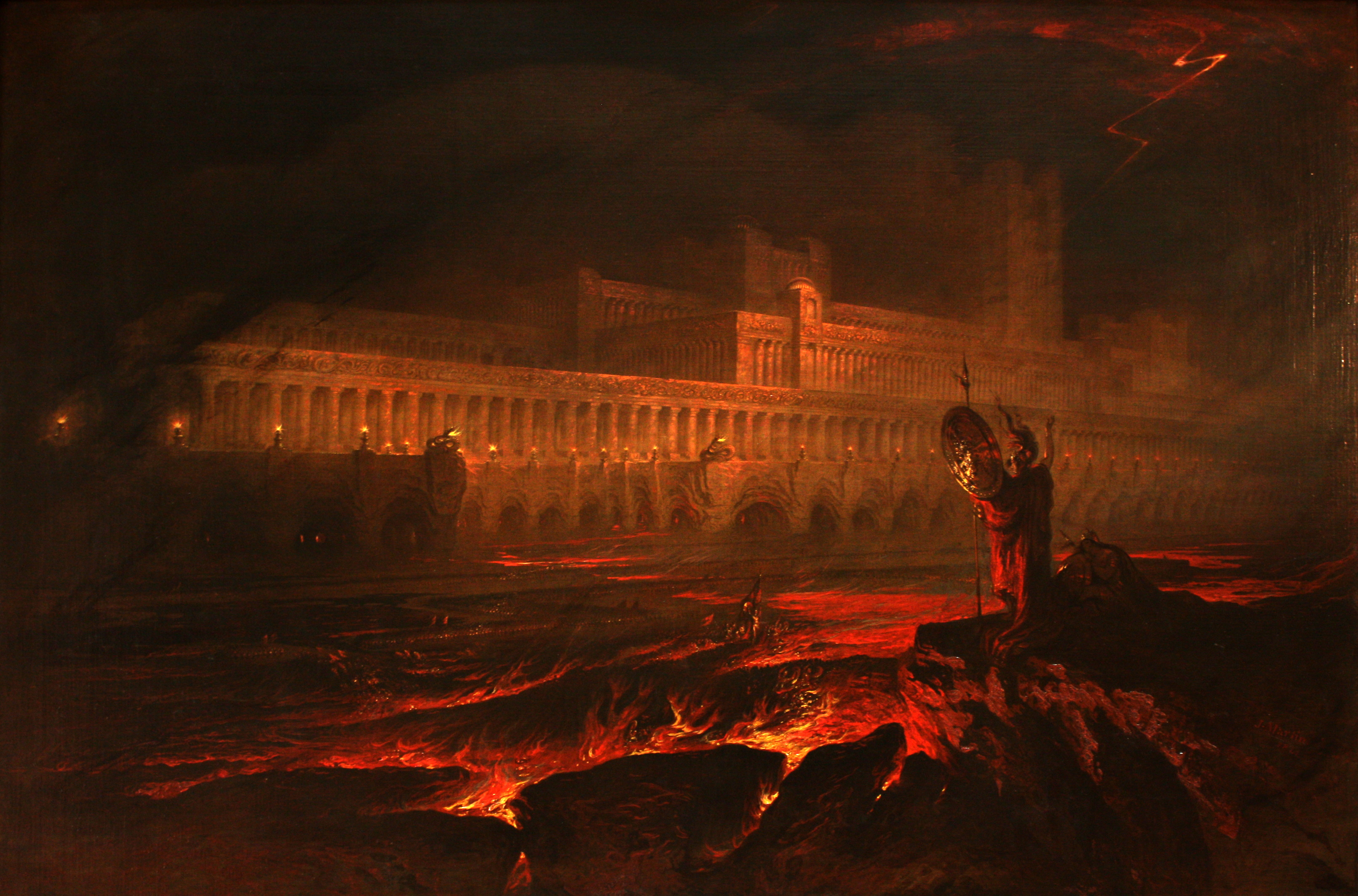
The fantasy architecture of John Martin: Pandemonium, inspired by John Milton's Paradise Lost (Louvre Museum).

The children's imagination was also influenced by three prints of engravings in mezzotint by John Martin around 1820. Charlotte and Branwell made copies of the prints Belshazzar's Feast, Déluge, and Joshua Commanding the Sun to Stand Still upon Gibeon (1816), which hung on the walls of the parsonage.

Martin's fantastic architecture is reflected in the Glass Town and Angrian writings, where he appears himself among Branwell's characters and under the name of Edward de Lisle, the greatest painter and portraitist of Verdopolis, the capital of Glass Town. One of Sir Edward de Lisle's major works, Les Quatre Genii en Conseil, is inspired by Martin's illustration for John Milton's Paradise Lost. Together with Byron, John Martin seems to have been one of the artistic influences essential to the Brontës' universe.

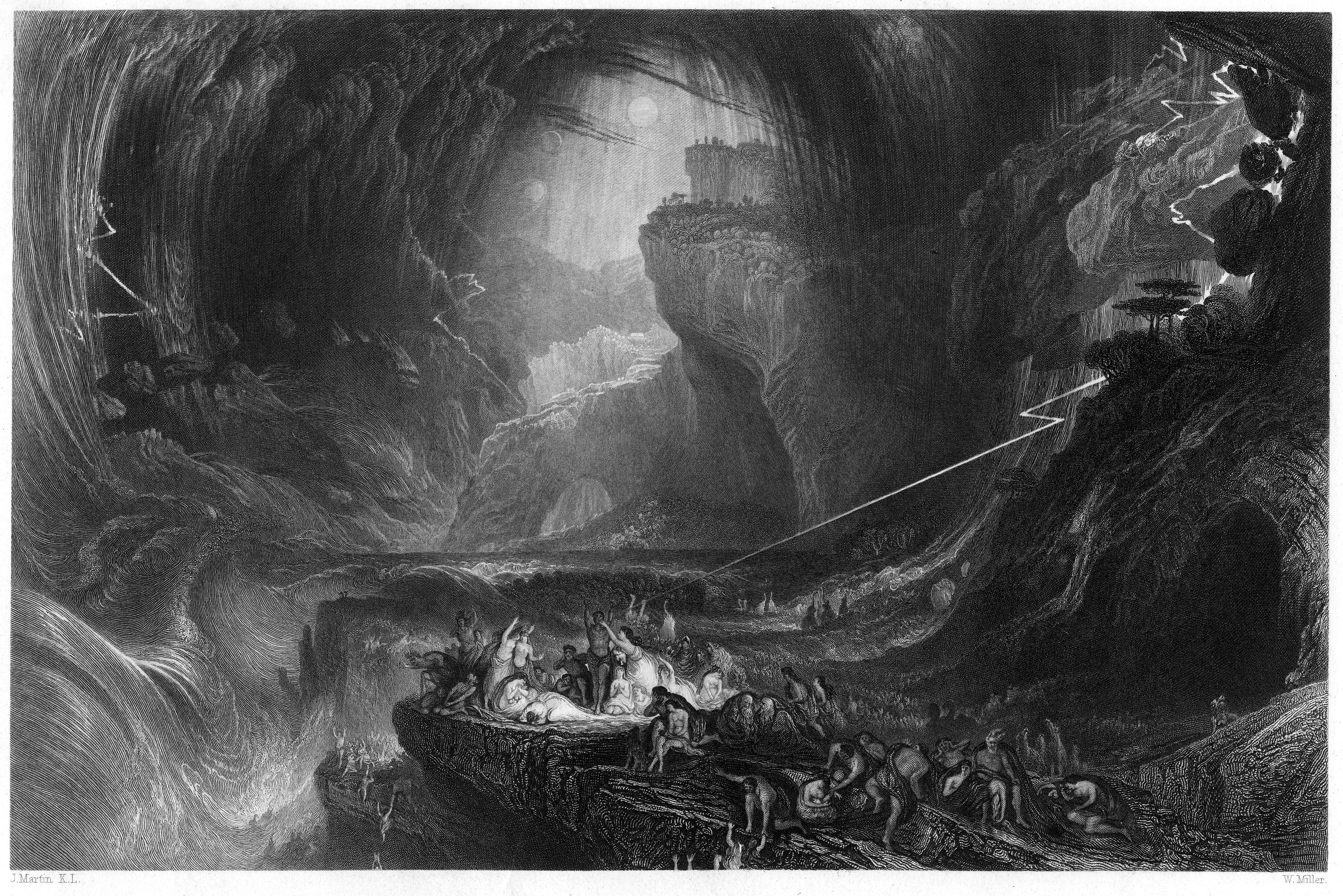
Déluge by John Martin

==== Anne's morals and realism ====
The influence revealed by Agnes Grey and The Tenant of Wildfell Hall is much less clear. Anne's works are largely founded on her experience as a governess and on that of her brother's decline. Furthermore, they demonstrate her conviction, a legacy from her father, that books should provide moral education. This sense of moral duty and the need to record it, are more evident in The Tenant of Wildfell Hall. The influence of the gothic novels of Ann Radcliffe, Horace Walpole, Gregory "Monk" Lewis and Charles Maturin is noticeable, and that of Walter Scott too, if only because the heroine, abandoned and left alone, resists importunities not only through her almost supernatural talents, but by her powerful temperament.

Jane Eyre, Agnes Grey, The Tenant of Wildfell Hall, Shirley, Villette and even The Professor present a linear structure concerning characters who advance through life after several trials and tribulations, to find a kind of happiness in love and virtue, recalling works of religious inspiration of the 17th century such as John Bunyan's The Pilgrim's Progress or his Grace abounding to the Chief of Sinners. In a more profane manner, the hero or heroine follows a picaresque itinerary such as in Miguel de Cervantes (1547–1616), Daniel Defoe (1660–1731), Henry Fielding (1707–1764) and Tobias Smollett (1721–1771). This lively tradition continued into the 19th century with the rags to riches genre to which almost all the great Victorian romancers have contributed. The protagonist is thrown by fate into poverty and after many difficulties achieves a golden happiness. Often an artifice is employed to effect the passage from one state to another such as an unexpected inheritance, a miraculous gift, grand reunions, etc., (Note: See Oliver Twist, David Copperfield, Great Expectations, just to mention Charles Dickens) and in a sense it is the route followed by Charlotte's and Anne's protagonists, even if the riches they win are more those of the heart than of the wallet. Apart from its Gothic elements, Wuthering Heights moves like a Greek tragedy and possesses its music, the cosmic dimensions of the epics of John Milton, and the power of the Shakespearian theatre. One can hear the echoes of King Lear as well as the completely different characters of Romeo and Juliet. The Brontës were also seduced by the writings of Walter Scott, and in 1834 Charlotte exclaimed, "For fiction, read Walter Scott and only him—all novels after his are without value."

=== Governesses and Charlotte's idea ===
==== Early teaching opportunities ====
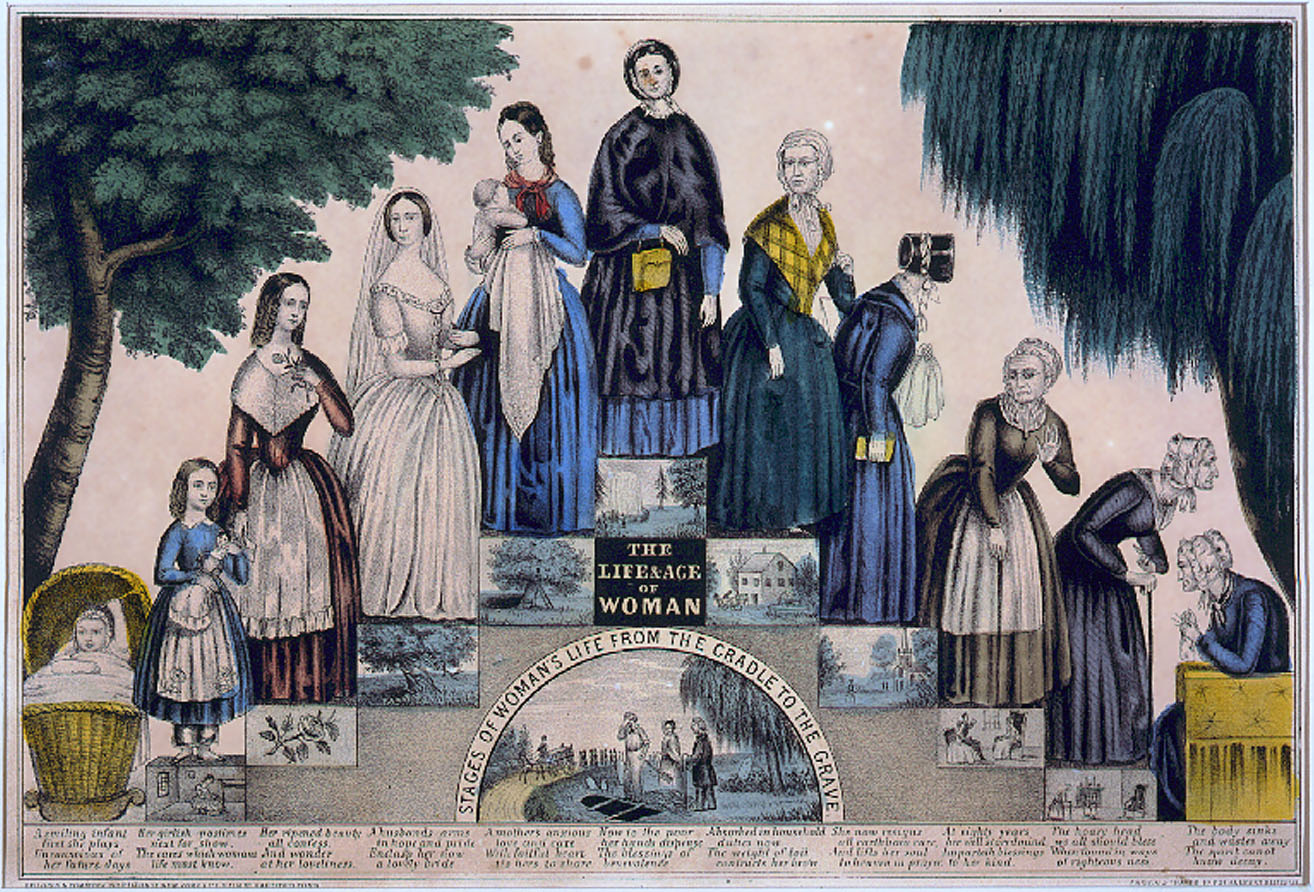
The life of a woman as imagined in the Victorian world around 1840.

Through their father's influence and their own intellectual curiosity, they were able to benefit from an education that placed them among knowledgeable people, but Mr Brontë's emoluments were modest. The only options open to the girls were either marriage or a choice between the professions of school mistress or governess. The Brontë sisters found positions in families wherein they educated often rebellious young children, or found employment as school teachers. The possibility of becoming a paid companion to a rich and solitary woman might have been a fall-back role but one that would have probably bored any of the sisters intolerably. Janet Todd's Mary Wollstonecraft, a revolutionary life mentions the predicament.

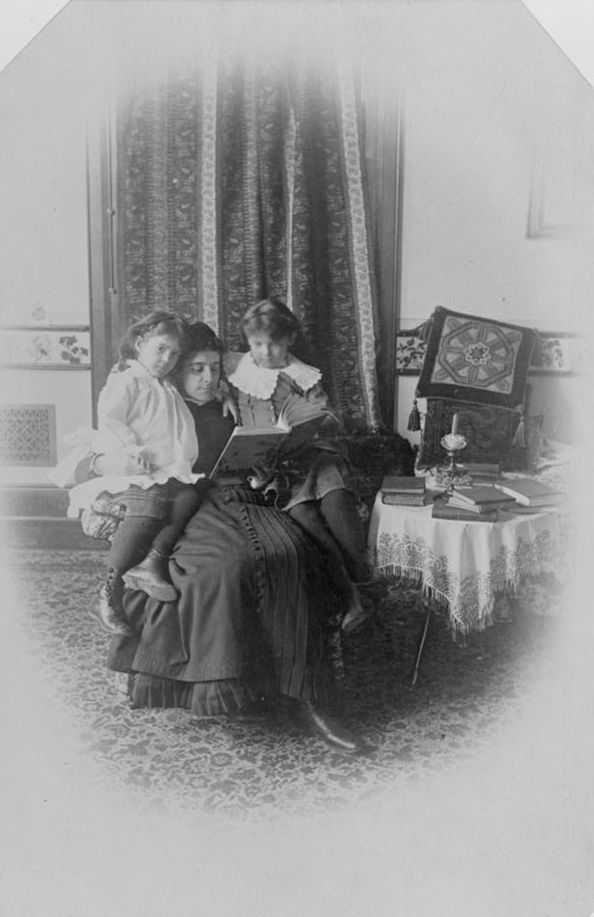
Governess in a rich English family in the second half of the 19th century

Unlike her two (surviving) sisters, Emily never became a governess. Her sole professional experience would be an experiment in teaching during six months of intolerable exile in Miss Patchett's school at Law Hill (between Haworth and Halifax). In contrast, Charlotte had teaching positions at Miss Margaret Wooler's school and in Brussels with the Hegers. She became governess to the Sidgwicks, the Stonegappes and the Lotherdales where she worked for several months in 1839, then with Mrs White, at Upperhouse House, Rawdon, from March to September 1841. Anne became a governess and worked for Mrs Ingham, at Blake Hall, Mirfield from April to December 1839, then for Mrs Robinson at Thorp Green Hall, Little Ouseburn, near York, where she also obtained employment for her brother in a futile attempt to stabilise him.

==== Working as governesses ====
The family's finances did not flourish, and Aunt Branwell spent the money with caution. Emily had a visceral need of her home and the countryside that surrounded it, and to leave it would cause her to languish and wither. (Note: Which had happened whenever she left Haworth for any length of time such as at Miss Wooler's school, or when teaching in Law Hill, and during her stay in Brussels.) Charlotte and Anne, being more realistic, did not hesitate in finding work and from April 1839 to December 1841 the two sisters had several posts as governesses. Not staying long with each family, their employment would last for some months or a single season. However, Anne did stay with the Robinsons in Thorp Green where things went well, from May 1840 to June 1845.

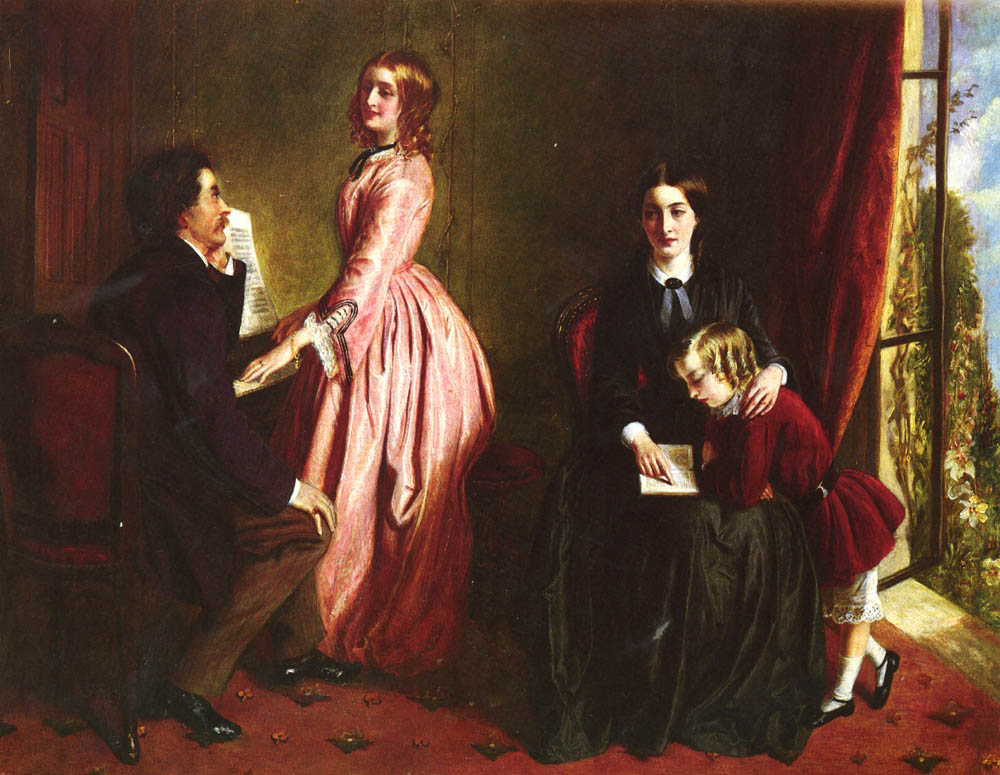
The Governess, Rebecca Solomon, 1854

In the meantime, Charlotte had an idea that would place all the advantages on her side. On advice from her father and friends, she thought that she and her sisters had the intellectual capacity to create a school for young girls in the parsonage where their Sunday School classes took place. It was agreed to offer the future pupils the opportunity of correctly learning modern languages and that preparation for this should be done abroad, which led to a further decision. Among the possibilities, Paris and Lille were considered, but were rejected due to aversion to the French. Indeed, the French Revolution and the Napoleonic Wars had not been forgotten by the Tory-spirited and deeply conservative girls. On the recommendation of a pastor based in Brussels, who wanted to be of help, Belgium was chosen, where they could also study German and music. Aunt Branwell provided the funds for the Brussels project.

=== School project and study trip to Brussels ===
==== Charlotte's and Emily's journey to Brussels ====
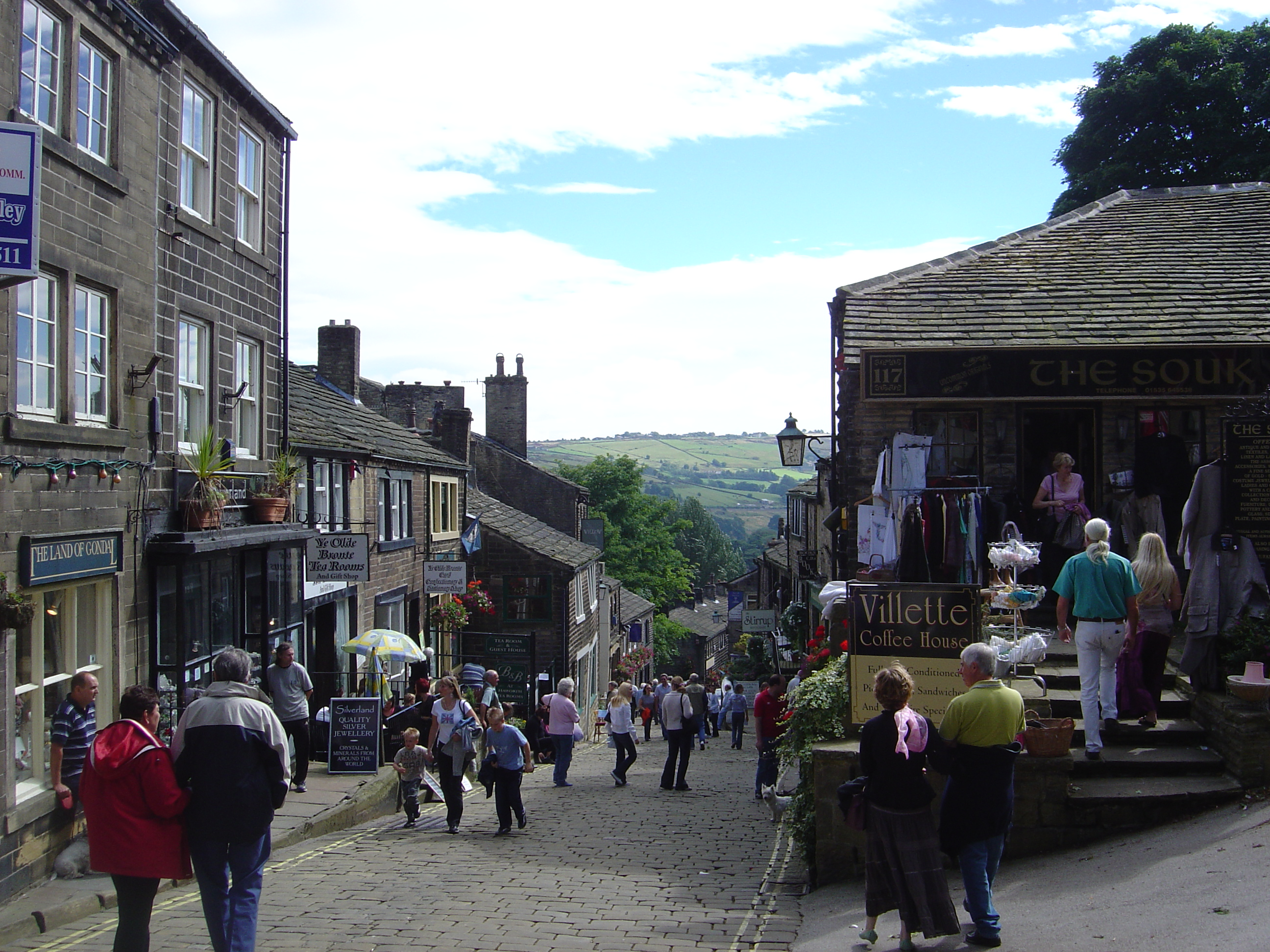
Today's main road through Haworth

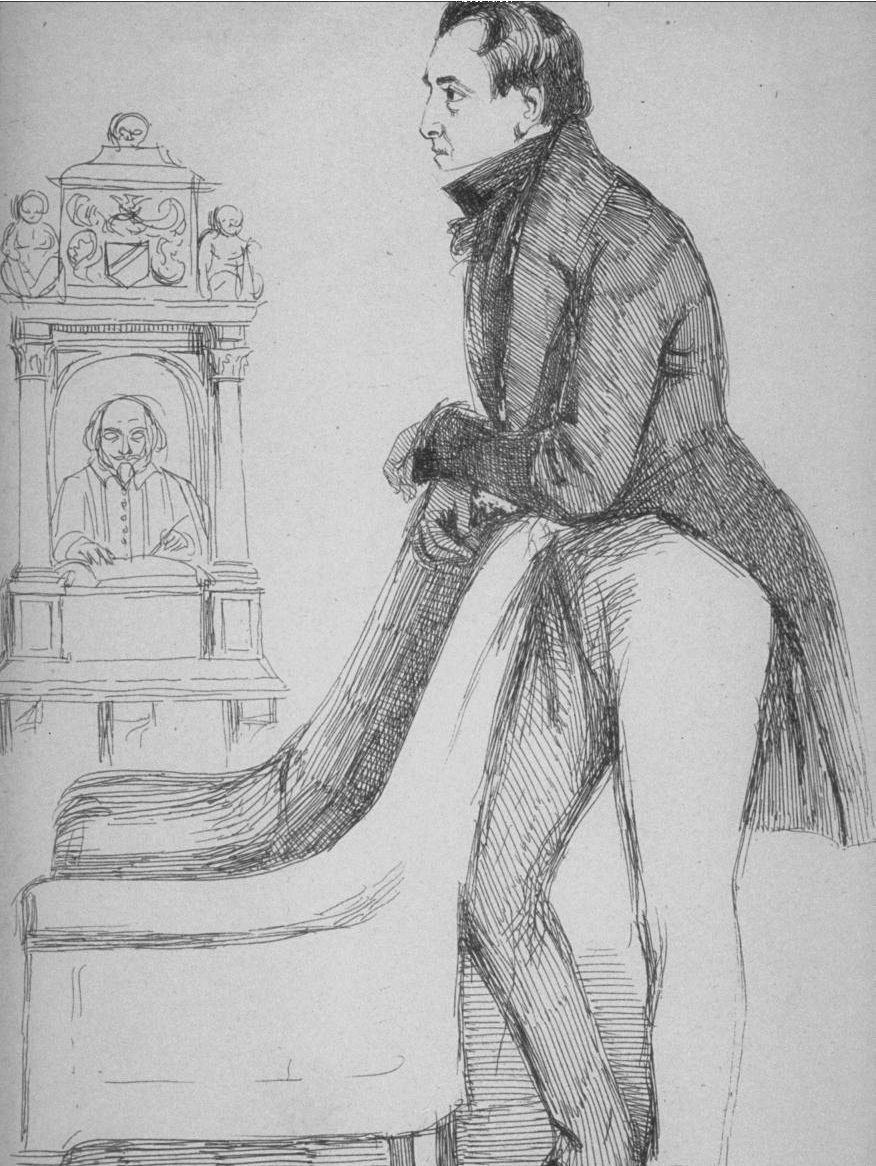
Portrait of James Sheridan Knowles, in Fraser's Magazine 1838

Emily and Charlotte arrived in Brussels in February 1842 accompanied by their father. Once there, they enrolled at Monsieur and Madame Heger's boarding school in the Rue d'Isabelle, for six months. Claire Heger was the second wife of Constantin, and it was she who founded and directed the school while Constantin had the responsibility for the higher French classes. According to Miss Wheelwright, a former pupil, he had the intellect of a genius. He was passionate about his auditorium, demanding many lectures, perspectives, and structured analyses. He was also a good-looking man with regular features, bushy hair, very black whiskers, and wore an excited expression while sounding forth on great authors about whom he invited his students to make a pastiche on general or philosophical themes.

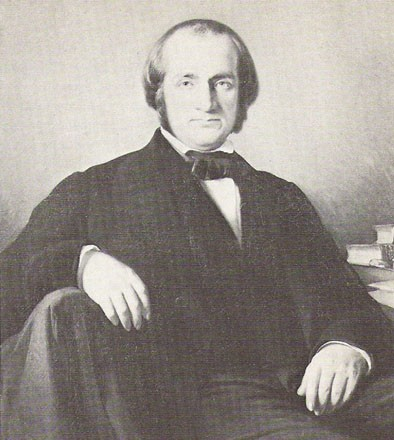
Constantin Heger

The lessons, especially those of Constantin Heger, were very much appreciated by Charlotte, and the two sisters showed exceptional intelligence, although Emily hardly liked her teacher and was somewhat rebellious. Emily learned German and to play the piano with natural brilliance and very quickly the two sisters were writing literary and philosophical essays in an advanced level of French. After six months of study, Mme Heger suggested they stay at the boarding school free of charge, in return for giving some lessons. After much hesitation, the girls accepted. Neither of them felt particularly attached to their students, and only one, Mademoiselle de Bassompierre, then aged 16, later expressed any affection for her teacher Emily, which appeared to be mutual, and made her a gift of a signed, detailed drawing of a storm ravaged pine tree.

==== Return and recall ====
The death of their aunt in October of the same year forced them to return once more to Haworth. Aunt Branwell had left all her worldly goods in equal shares to her nieces and to Eliza Kingston, a cousin in Penzance, which had the immediate effect of purging all their debts and providing a small reserve of funds. Nevertheless, they were asked to return to the Heger's boarding school in Brussels as they were regarded as being competent and were needed. They were each offered teaching posts in the boarding school, English for Charlotte and music for Emily. However, Charlotte returned alone to Belgium in January 1843. Emily remained critical of Monsieur Heger, in spite of the excellent opinion he held of her. He later stated that she 'had the spirit of a man', and would probably become a great traveller due to her being gifted with a superior faculty of reason that allowed her to deduce ancient knowledge from new spheres of knowledge, and her unbending willpower would have triumphed over all obstacles.

==== Charlotte returns ====
Almost a year to the day, enamoured for some time for Monsieur Heger, Charlotte resigned and returned to Haworth. Her life at the school had not been without suffering, and on one occasion she ventured into the cathedral and entered a confessional. She may have had intention of converting to Catholicism, but it would only have been for a short time. During her absence, life at Haworth had become more difficult. Mr. Brontë had lost his sight although his cataract had been operated on with success in Manchester, and it was there in August 1846, when Charlotte arrived at his bedside that she began to write Jane Eyre. Meanwhile, her brother Branwell fell into a rapid decline punctuated by dramas, drunkenness and delirium. Due partly to Branwell's poor reputation, the school project failed and was abandoned.

Charlotte wrote four long, very personal, and sometimes vague letters to Monsieur Heger that never received replies. The extent of Charlotte Brontë's feelings for Heger were not fully realised until 1913, when her letters to him were published for the first time. Heger had first shown them to Elizabeth Gaskell when she visited him in 1856 while researching her biography The Life of Charlotte Brontë, but she concealed their true significance. These letters, referred to as the "Heger Letters", had been ripped up at some stage by Heger, but his wife had retrieved the pieces from the wastepaper bin and meticulously glued or sewn them back together. Paul Héger, Constantin's son, and his sisters gave these letters to the British Museum, and they were shortly thereafter printed in The Times.

== Brontë sisters' literary career ==
=== First publication: Poems, by Currer, Ellis, and Acton Bell ===
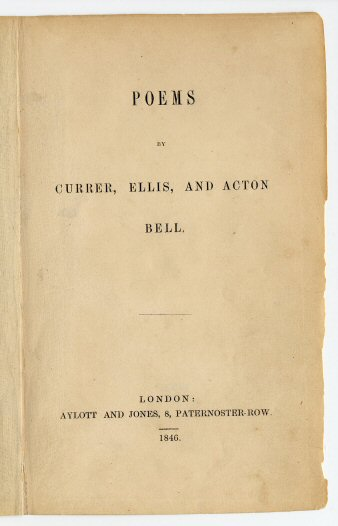
1846 issue of Brontë poems under the pseudonyms of Currer (Charlotte), Ellis (Emily) and Acton (Anne) Bell

The writing that had begun so early never left the family. Charlotte had ambition like her brother, and wrote to the poet laureate Robert Southey to submit several poems in his style (though Branwell was kept at a distance from her project). She received a hardly encouraging reply after several months. Southey, still illustrious today although his star has somewhat waned, was one of the great figures of English Romanticism, along with William Wordsworth and Samuel Taylor Coleridge, and he shared the prejudice of the times; literature, or more particularly poetry (for women had been publishing fiction and enjoying critical, popular and economic success for over a century by this time), was considered a man's business, and not an appropriate occupation for ladies.

However, Charlotte did not allow herself to be discouraged. Furthermore, coincidence came to her aid. One day in autumn 1845 while alone in the dining room she noticed a small notebook lying open in the drawer of Emily's portable writing desk and "of my sister Emily's handwriting". She read it and was dazzled by the beauty of the poems that she did not know. The discovery of this treasure was what she recalled five years later, and according to Juliet Barker, she erased the excitement that she had felt "more than surprise ..., a deep conviction that these were not common effusions, nor at all like the poetry women generally write. I thought them condensed and terse, vigorous and genuine. To my ear, they had a peculiar music—wild, melancholy, and elevating." In the following paragraph Charlotte describes her sister's indignant reaction at her having ventured into such an intimate realm with impunity. It took Emily hours to calm down and days to be convinced to publish the poems.

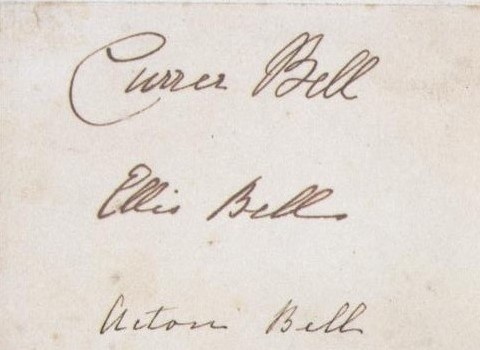
The only existing specimen of the three signatures of Currer, Ellis and Acton Bell

Charlotte envisaged a joint publication by the three sisters. Anne was easily won over to the project, and the work was shared, compared and edited. Once the poems had been chosen, nineteen for Charlotte and twenty-one each for Anne and Emily, Charlotte went about searching for a publisher. She took advice from William and Robert Chambers of Edinburgh, directors of one of their favourite magazines, Chambers's Edinburgh Journal. It is thought, although no documents exist to support the claim, that they advised the sisters to contact Aylott & Jones, a small publishing house at 8, Paternoster Row, London, who accepted, but at the authors' own risk since they felt the commercial risk to the company was too great. The work thus appeared in 1846, published using the andronyms (male pseudonyms) of Currer (Charlotte), Ellis (Emily) and Acton (Anne) Bell. These were very uncommon forenames but the initials of each of the sisters were preserved and the patronym could have been inspired by that of the vicar of the parish, Arthur Bell Nicholls. It was in fact on 18 May 1845 that he took up his duties at Haworth, at the moment when the publication project was well advanced.

The book attracted hardly any attention. Only three copies were sold, of which one was purchased by Fredrick Enoch, a resident of Cornmarket, Warwick, who in admiration, wrote to the publisher to request an autograph—the only extant single document carrying the three authors' signatures in their pseudonyms, and they continued creating their prose, each one producing a book a year later. Each worked in secret, unceasingly discussing their writing for hours at the dinner table, after which their father would open the door at 9 p.m. with "Don't stay up late, girls!", then rewinding the clock and taking the stairs up to his room.

=== Fame ===
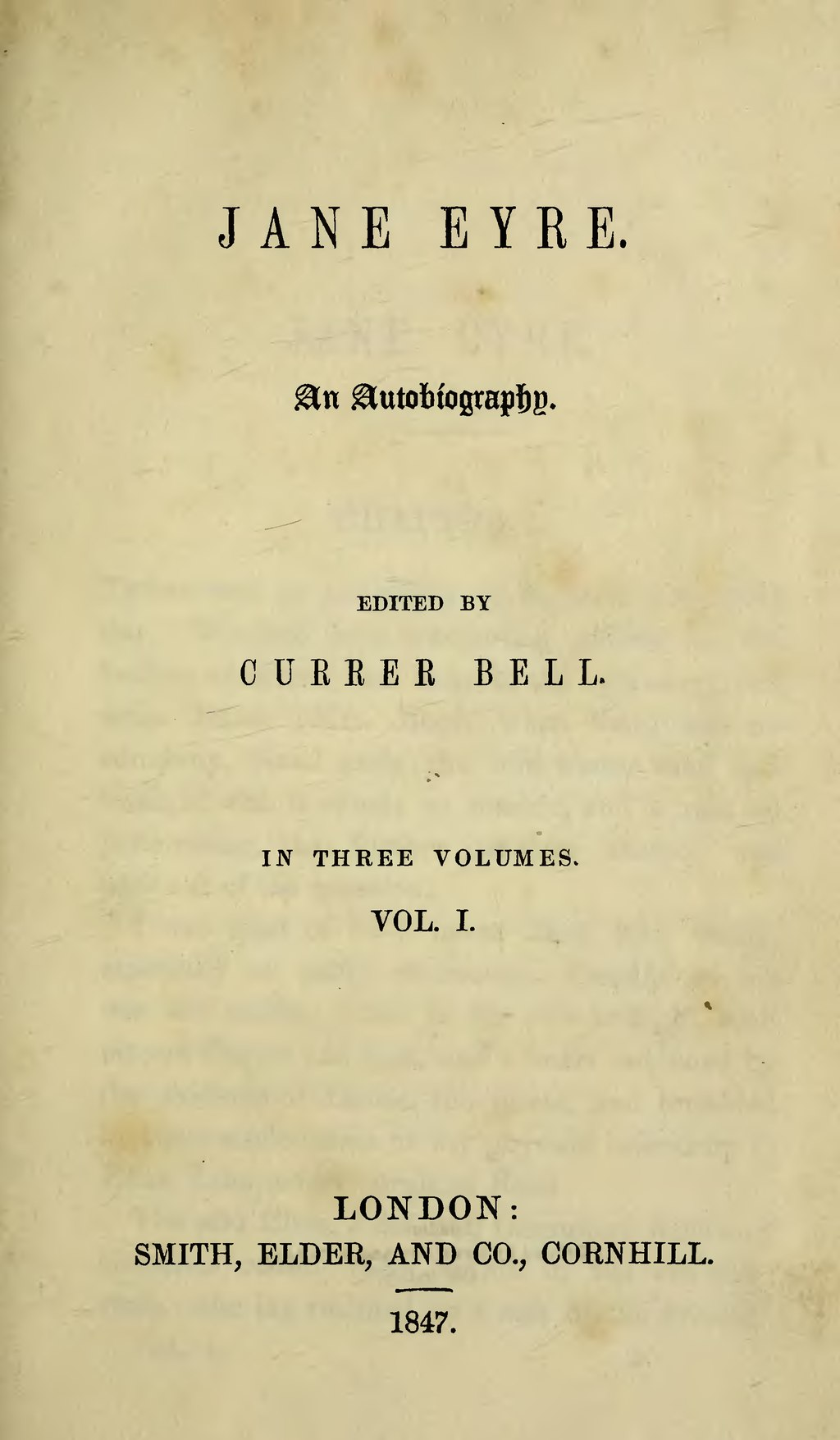
Title page of Jane Eyre, edited by Currer Bell

==== 1847 ====
Charlotte's Jane Eyre, Emily's Wuthering Heights and Anne's Agnes Grey appeared in 1847 after many tribulations, again for reasons of finding a publisher. The packets containing the manuscripts were often returned to the parsonage and Charlotte simply added a new address; she did this at least a dozen times during the year. The first one was finally published by Smith, Elder & Co in London. The 23-year-old owner, George Smith, had specialised in publishing scientific revues, aided by his perspicacious reader William Smith Williams. Emily and Anne's manuscripts were confided to Thomas Cautley Newby, who intended to compile a three-decker; more economical for sale and for loan in the "circulating libraries". The two first volumes included Wuthering Heights and the third one Agnes Grey. Both novels attracted critical acclaim, occasionally harsh about Wuthering Heights, praised for the originality of the subject and its narrative style, but viewed with suspicion because of its outrageous violence and immorality—surely, the critics wrote, a work of a man with a depraved mind. Critics were fairly neutral about Agnes Grey, but more flattering for Jane Eyre, which soon became a best-seller, despite some commentators denouncing it as an affront to good morals.

==== Jane Eyre and rising fame ====
The pseudonymous (Currer Bell) publication in 1847 of Jane Eyre, An Autobiography established a dazzling reputation for Charlotte. In July 1848, Charlotte and Anne (Emily had refused to go along with them) travelled by train to London to prove to Smith, Elder & Co. that each sister was indeed an independent author, for Thomas Cautley Newby, the publisher of Wuthering Heights and Agnes Grey, had launched a rumour that the three novels were the work of one author, understood to be Ellis Bell (Emily). George Smith was extremely surprised to find two gawky, ill-dressed country girls paralysed with fear, who, to identify themselves, held out the letters addressed to Messrs. Acton, Currer and Ellis Bell. Taken by such surprise, he introduced them to his mother with all the dignity their talent merited, and invited them to the opera for a performance of Gioachino Rossini's Barber of Seville.

==== Wuthering Heights ====
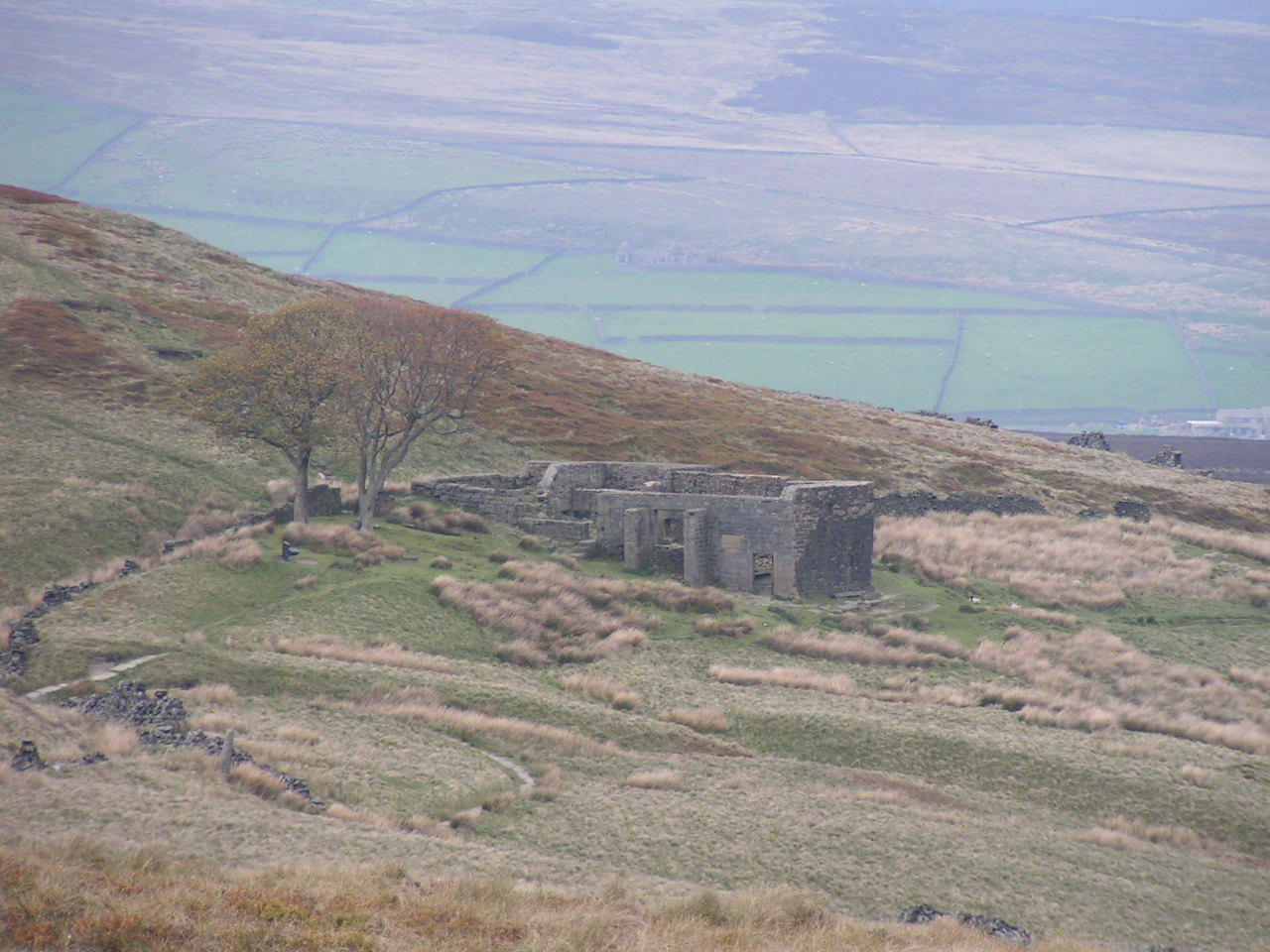
Top Withens, the ruin on the moors near Haworth that inspired Wuthering Heights

Emily Brontë's Wuthering Heights was published in 1847 under the masculine pseudonym Ellis Bell, by Thomas Cautley Newby, in two companion volumes to that of Anne's (Acton Bell), Agnes Grey. Controversial from the start of its release, its originality, its subject, narrative style and troubled action raised intrigue. Certain critics condemned it, but sales were nevertheless considerable for an unknown author of a novel that defied all conventions.

It is a work of black Romanticism, covering three generations isolated in the cold spring of the countryside with two opposing elements: the dignified manor of Thrushcross Grange and the rambling dilapidated pile of Wuthering Heights. The main characters, swept by tumults of the earth, the skies and the hearts, are strange and often possessed of unheard-of violence and deprivations. The story is told in a scholarly fashion, with two narrators, the traveller and tenant Lockwood, and the housekeeper/governess, Nelly Dean, with two sections in the first person, one direct, one cloaked, which overlap each other with digressions and sub-plots that form, from apparently scattered fragments, a coherently locked unit.

==== 1848, Anne's The Tenant of Wildfell Hall ====
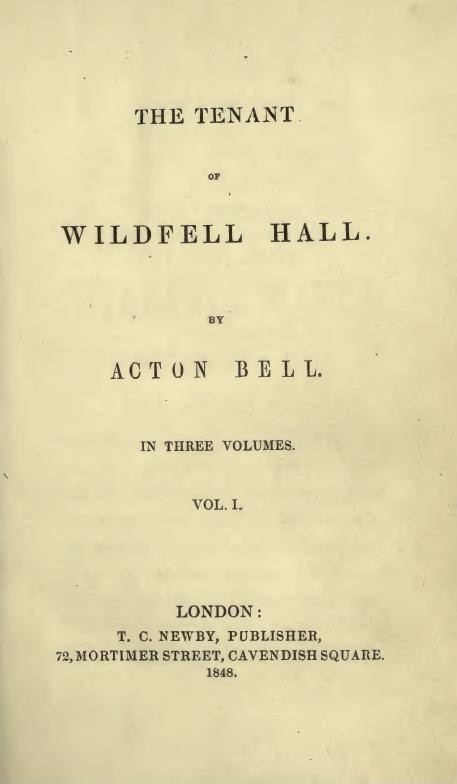
Title page of the original 1848 publication of The Tenant of Wildfell Hall, Anne Brontë's second novel (under the name of Acton Bell)

One year before her death in May 1849, Anne published a second novel. Far more ambitious than her previous novel, The Tenant of Wildfell Hall was a great success and rapidly outsold Emily's Wuthering Heights. However, the critical reception was mixed—praise for the novel's "power" and "effect" and sharp criticism for being "coarse". Charlotte Brontë herself, Anne's sister, wrote to her publisher that it "hardly seems to me desirable to preserve ... the choice of subject in that work is a mistake." After Anne's death, Charlotte prevented the novel's republication and thus condemned her sister to temporary oblivion.

The master theme is the alcoholism of a man who causes the downfall of his family. Helen Graham, the central character, gets married for love to Arthur Huntingdon, whom she soon discovers to be lecherous, violent and alcoholic. She is forced to break with the conventions that would keep her in the family home that has become hell, and to leave with her child to seek secret refuge in the old house of Wildfell Hall. When the alcohol causes her husband's ultimate decline, she returns to care for him in total abnegation until his death.

Today, The Tenant of Wildfell Hall is considered by most of the critics to be one of the first sustained feminist novels.

==== Identities revealed ====
In 1850, a little over a year after the deaths of Emily and Anne, Charlotte wrote a preface for the re-print of the combined edition of Wuthering Heights and Agnes Grey, in which she publicly revealed the real identities of all three sisters.

== Charlotte Brontë ==
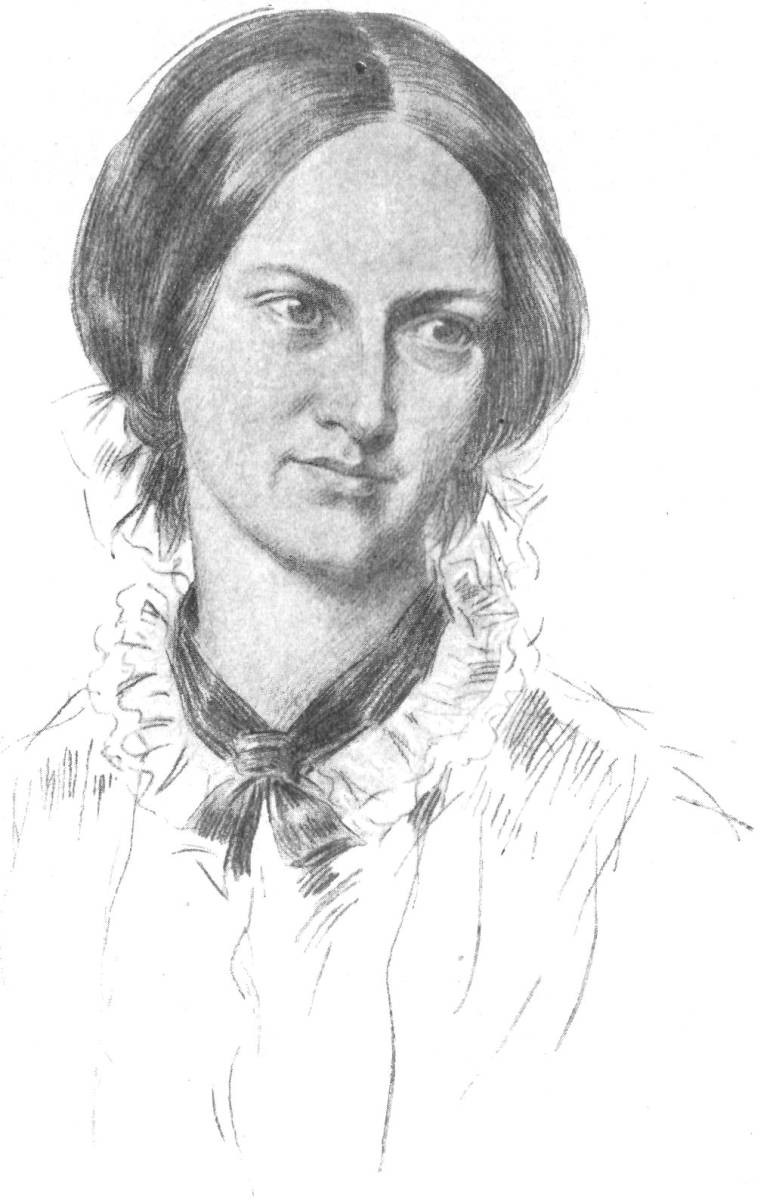
Charlotte Brontë, probably by George Richmond (1850)

=== Denunciation of boarding schools (Jane Eyre) ===
Conditions at the school at Cowan Bridge, where Maria and Elizabeth may have contracted the tuberculosis from which they died, were probably no worse than those at many other schools of the time. (For example, several decades before the Brontë sisters' experience at Cowan Bridge, Jane Austen and her sister Cassandra contracted typhus at a similar boarding school, and Jane nearly died. The Austen sisters' education, like that of the Brontë sisters, was continued at home.) Nevertheless, Charlotte blamed Cowan Bridge for her sisters' deaths, especially its poor medical care—chiefly, repeated emetics and blood-lettings—and the negligence of the school's doctor, who was the director's brother-in-law. Charlotte's vivid memories of the privations at Cowan Bridge were poured into her depiction of Lowood School in Jane Eyre: the scanty and often spoiled food, the lack of heating and adequate clothing, the periodic epidemics of illness such as "low fever" (probably typhus), the severity and arbitrariness of the punishments, and even the harshness of particular teachers (a Miss Andrews who taught at Cowan Bridge is thought to have been Charlotte's model for Miss Scatcherd in Jane Eyre). Elizabeth Gaskell, a personal friend and the first biographer of Charlotte, confirmed that Cowan Bridge was Charlotte's model for Lowood and insisted that conditions there in Charlotte's day were egregious. More recent biographers have argued that the food, clothing, heating, medical care and discipline at Cowan Bridge were not considered sub-standard for religious schools of the time, testaments of the era's complacency about these intolerable conditions. One scholar has commended Patrick Brontë for his perspicacity in removing all his daughters from the school, a few weeks before the deaths of Maria and Elizabeth.

=== Literary encounters ===
Following the overwhelming success of Jane Eyre, Charlotte was pressured by George Smith, her publisher, to travel to London to meet her public. Despite the extreme timidity that paralysed her among strangers and made her almost incapable of expressing herself, Charlotte consented to be lionised, and in London was introduced to other great writers of the era, including Harriet Martineau and William Makepeace Thackeray, both of whom befriended her. Charlotte especially admired Thackeray, whose portrait, given to her by Smith, still hangs in the dining room at Haworth parsonage.

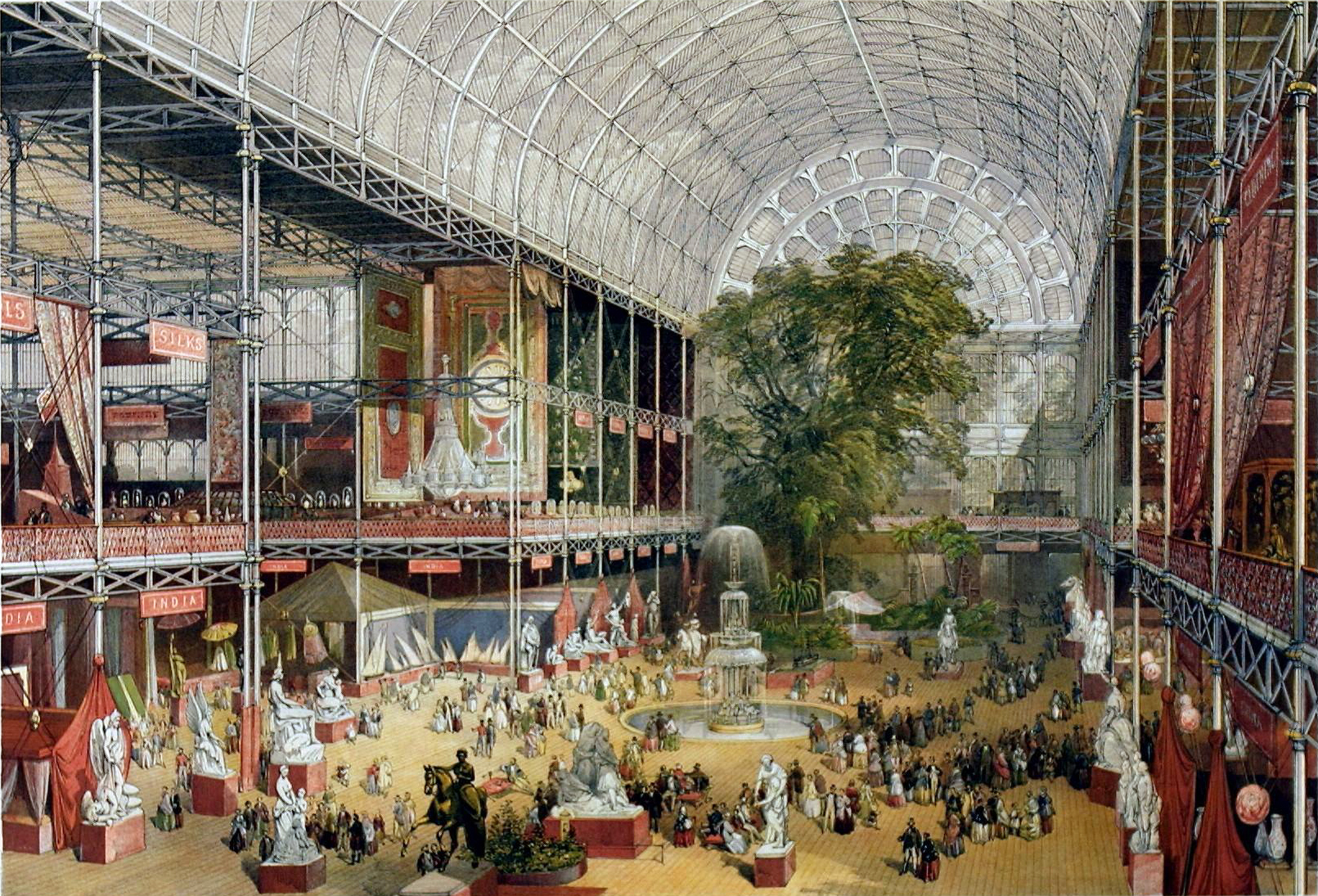
Interior of The Crystal Palace, during the 1851 Great Exhibition

On one occasion during a public gathering, Thackeray introduced Charlotte to his mother as Jane Eyre and when Charlotte called on him the next day, he received an extended dressing-down, in which Smith had to intervene.

During her trip to London in 1851 she visited the Great Exhibition and The Crystal Palace. In 1849 she published Shirley and in 1853 Villette.

=== Marriage and death ===
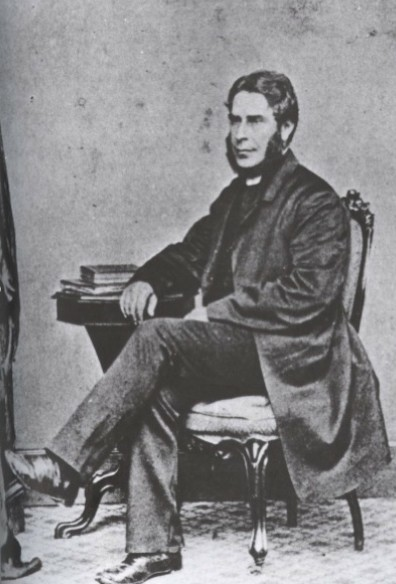
Portrait of Arthur Bell Nicholls, at the time of his marriage to Charlotte Brontë.

The Brontë sisters were highly amused by the behaviour of the curates they met. Arthur Bell Nicholls (1818–1906) had been curate of Haworth for seven and a half years, when contrary to all expectations, and to the fury of Patrick Brontë (their father), he proposed to Charlotte. Although impressed by his dignity and deep voice, as well as by his near complete emotional collapse when she rejected him, she found him rigid, conventional and rather narrow-minded "like all the curates"—as she wrote to Ellen Nussey. After she declined his proposal, Nicholls, pursued by the anger of Patrick Brontë, left his functions for several months. However, little by little her feelings evolved and after slowly convincing her father, she finally married Nicholls on 29 June 1854.

On return from their honeymoon in Ireland where she had been introduced to Mr. Nicholls' aunt and cousins, her life completely changed. She adopted her new duties as a wife, which took up most of her time. She wrote to her friends telling them that Nicholls was a good and attentive husband, but that she nevertheless felt a kind of holy terror at her new situation. In a letter to Ellen Nussey (Nell), in 1854 she wrote "Indeed-indeed-Nell-it is a solemn and strange and perilous thing for a woman to become a wife."

The following year she died aged 38. The cause of death given at the time was tuberculosis, but it may have been complicated with typhoid fever (the water at Haworth being likely contaminated due to poor sanitation and the vast cemetery that surrounded the church and the parsonage) and hyperemesis gravidarum from her pregnancy that was in its early stage.

The first biography of Charlotte was written by Elizabeth Cleghorn Gaskell at the request of Patrick Brontë, and published in 1857, helping to create the myth of a family of condemned genius, living in a painful and romantic solitude. After having stayed at Haworth several times and having accommodated Charlotte in Plymouth Grove, Manchester, and having become her friend and confidant, Mrs Gaskell certainly had the advantage of knowing the family.

=== Novels ===
- Jane Eyre (1847)
- Shirley (1849)
- Villette (1853)
- The Professor (1857)

=== Unfinished fragments ===
These are outlines or unedited roughcasts which with the exception of Emma have been recently published.

- Ashford, written between 1840 and 1841, where certain characters from Angria are transported to Yorkshire and are included in a realistic plot.
- Willie Ellin, started after Shirley and Villette, and on which Charlotte worked relatively little in May and July 1853, is a story in three poorly linked parts in which the plot at this stage remains rather vague.
- The Moores is an outline for two short chapters with two characters, the brothers Robert Moore, a dominator, and John Henry Moore, an intellectual fanatic.
- Emma, already published in 1860 with an introduction from Thackeray. This brilliant fragment would doubtlessly have become a novel of similar scope to her previous ones. It later inspired the novel A Little Princess by Frances Hodgson Burnett.
- The Green Dwarf published in 2003. This story was probably inspired by The Black Dwarf by Walter Scott of whose novels Charlotte was a fan. The novel is a fictional history about a war that breaks out between Verdopolis (the capital of the confederation of Glass Town) and Senegal.

== Branwell Brontë ==
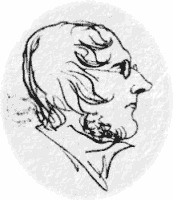
Branwell Brontë, self-portrait

Patrick Branwell Brontë (1817–1848) was considered by his father and sisters to be a genius, while the book by Daphne du Maurier (1986), The Infernal World of Branwell Brontë, contains numerous references to his addiction to alcohol and laudanum. He was an intelligent boy with many talents and interested in many subjects, especially literature. He was often the driving force in the Brontë siblings' construction of the imaginary worlds. He was artistic and was encouraged by his father to pursue this.

While trying to make a name as an artist, he left for London, but used up his father's allowance in a matter of days in cafés of ill-repute. His attempts to obtain low-paid work failed, and very quickly he foundered in alcohol and laudanum, unable to regain his stability.

Anne Brontë obtained employment for him in January 1843, but nearly three years later he was dismissed. In September 1848, after several years of decline, he died from tuberculosis. On his death, his father tearfully repeated, "My brilliant boy", while the clearheaded and totally loyal Emily wrote that his condition had been "hopeless".

Branwell is the author of Juvenilia, which he wrote as a child with his sister Charlotte, Glass Town, Angria, poems, pieces of prose and verse under the pseudonym of Northangerland, (Note: One of the key characters of Glass Town, Alexander Rogue, created by Branwell, finally became Earl of Northangerland.) such as "Real Rest", published by the Halifax Guardian (8 November 1846) from several articles accepted by local newspapers and from an unfinished novel probably from around 1845 entitled And the Weary are at Rest.

== Emily Brontë ==
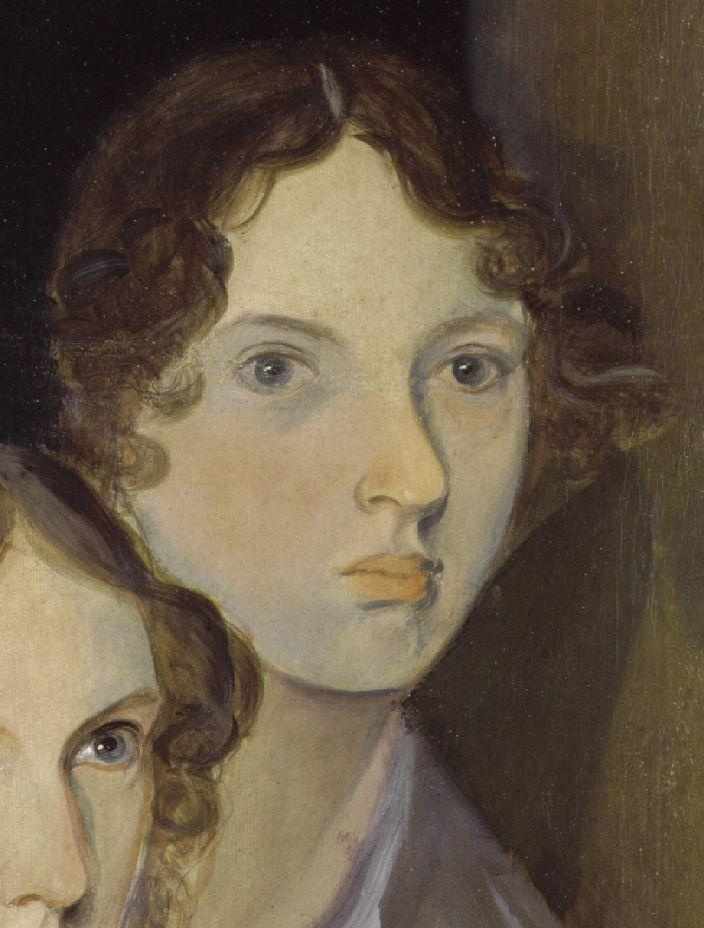
The only undisputed portrait of Emily Brontë, from a group portrait by her brother Branwell

Emily Brontë (1818–1848) has been called the "Sphinx of Literature", writing without the slightest desire for fame and only for her own satisfaction. She was obsessively timid outside the family circle, to the point of turning her back on her partners in conversation without saying a word.

With a single novel, Wuthering Heights (1847), and poems with an elemental power, she reached the heights of literature. Though she was almost unknown during her life, posterity classes her as "top level" in the literary canon (Note: "The place of Wuthering Heights in the literary canon is assured" : see the synopsis of Wuthering Heights in the Critical commentary of Heather Glen, p. 351.) of English literature. Simone de Beauvoir, in The Second Sex (1949), chooses only Emily Brontë, Virginia Woolf and ("sometimes") Mary Webb, Colette and Katherine Mansfield, as among those who have tried to approach nature "in its inhuman freedom".

Above all, Emily loved to wander about the wild landscape of the moors around Haworth. In September 1848 her health began to decline rapidly. Consumptive, she refused all treatment, with the exception of a visit from a London doctor, because although it was already too late, her relatives insisted. Despite popular belief, Emily did not die on the dining room sofa. There is no contemporary evidence for the story and Charlotte, in her letter to William Smith Williams, mentions Emily's dog Keeper lying at the side of her death bed. It is possible that she left an unfinished manuscript that Charlotte burned to avoid such controversy as followed the publication of Wuthering Heights. Several documents exist that allude to the possibility, although no proof corroborating this suggestion has ever been found.

=== Emily Brontë's poems ===
The complete poems of Emily Brontë. Click to view and read.

Emily's poems were probably written to be inserted in the saga of Gondal, several of whose characters she identified with right into adulthood. At the age of 28 she still acted out scenes from the little books with Anne while travelling on the train to York. "Remembrance" was one of the 21 of her poems that were chosen for 1846 joint publication with her siblings'.

== Anne Brontë ==
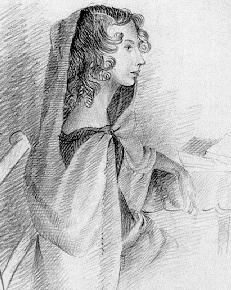
Portrait in pencil of Anne by her sister Charlotte.

Anne was not as celebrated as her other two sisters. Her second novel, The Tenant of Wildfell Hall, was prevented from being republished after Anne's death by her sister Charlotte, who wrote to her publisher that "it hardly appears to me desirable to preserve. The choice of subject in that work is a mistake, it was too little consonant with the character, tastes and ideas of the gentle, retiring inexperienced writer." This prevention is considered to be the main reason for Anne's being less renowned than her sisters.

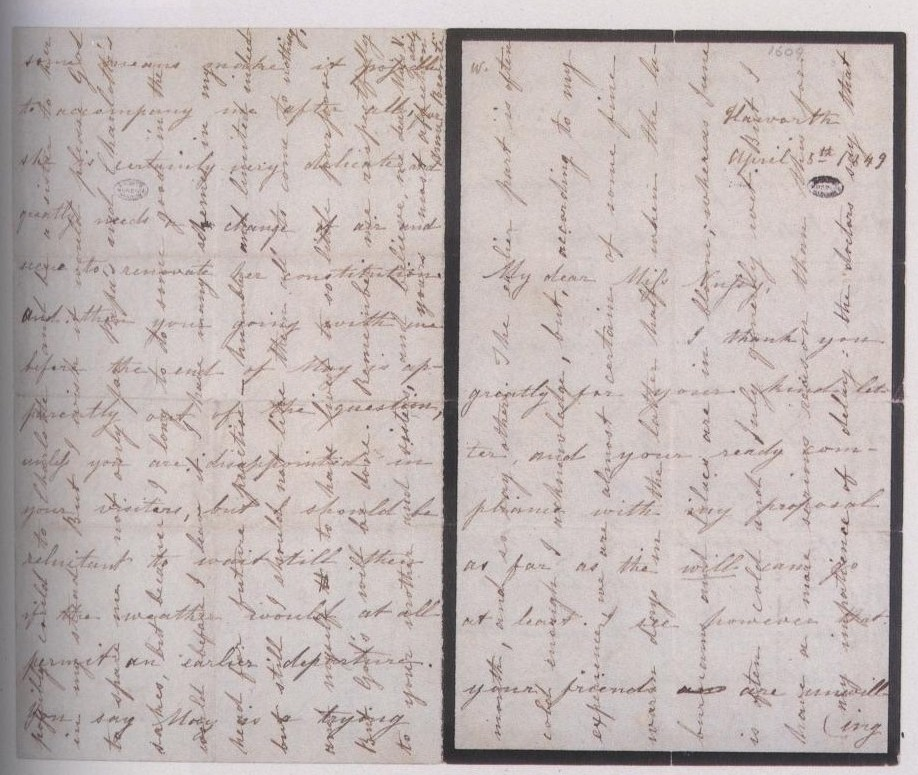
The letter from Anne to Ellen Nussey, of 5 April 1849.

Anne's health began to decline rapidly, like that of her brother and sister some months earlier. On 5 April 1849, she wrote to Ellen Nussey asking her to accompany her to Scarborough on the east coast. Anne confides her thoughts to Ellen:

I have no horror of death: if I thought it inevitable I think I could quietly resign myself to the prospect ... But I wish it would please God to spare me not only for Papa's and Charlotte's sakes, but because I long to do some good in the world before I leave it. I have many schemes in my head for future practise—humble and limited indeed—but still I should not like them all to come to nothing, and myself to have lived to so little purpose. But God's will be done.

Anne hoped that the sea air would improve her health, as recommended by the doctor, and Charlotte agreed to go.

On the Sunday morning she felt weaker and asked if she could be taken back to Haworth. The doctor confirmed that she was near to death and Anne thanked him for his candour. "Take courage, take courage" she murmured to Charlotte. She died at 2 pm on Monday 28 May. She is buried in the cemetery of St Mary's of Scarborough. Her gravestone inscription carried an error in her age: she died at the age of 29 and not at 28. It was noticed by Charlotte during her only visit, and she had the intention of asking the mason to correct it. Ill health did not leave him time to effect the repair and the tombstone remained in the same state until it was replaced by the Brontë Society in April 2013.

== Northern England at the time of the Brontës ==
In her 1857 biography The Life of Charlotte Brontë, Mrs Gaskell begins with two explanatory and descriptive chapters. The first one covers the wild countryside of the West Riding of Yorkshire, the little village of Haworth, the parsonage and the church surrounded by its vast cemetery perched on the top of a hill. The second chapter presents an overview of the social, sanitary and economic conditions of the region.

=== Social, sanitary and economic conditions in Haworth ===
The death toll within the Brontë family was not unusual for the area, and left little impression on the village population, who were confronted with death on a daily basis. When Patrick Brontë arrived, the parish was suffering from unemployment. The men sought work in the quarries and local handicrafts. The only businesses were the pharmacy, which supplied Branwell, and John Greenwood's stationery store where the Brontës were the best customers.

Haworth's population grew rapidly during the first half of the 19th century, from hardly 1,000 to 3,365 in 50 years. The village did not have a sewage system and the well water was contaminated by faecal matter and the decomposition of bodies in the cemetery on the hilltop. Life expectancy was less than 25 years and infant mortality was around 41% for children under six months of age. Most of the population lived by working the poorly fertile land of the moors and supplemented their incomes with work done at home, such as spinning and weaving wool from the sheep that were farmed on the moors. Conditions changed when the textile industry, already present since the end of the 17th century, grew with the mills being located on the banks of the River Worth, whose waters turned the wheels. Consequently, fewer people were needed to work them.

Food was scarce, often little more than porridge, resulting in vitamin deficiencies. Public hygiene was non-existent and lavatories were basic. The facilities at the parsonage were no more than a plank across a hole in a hut at the rear, with a lower plank for the children. In her thirties, Charlotte was described as having a toothless jaw by such persons as Mrs Gaskell, who stated in a letter dated 25 August 1850 to Catherine Winkworth: "large mouth and many teeth gone". However, food was reasonably plentiful in the family. They ate from well filled plates of porridge in the morning and piles of potatoes were peeled each day in the kitchen while Tabby told stories about her country, or Emily revised her German grammar. Sometimes Mr Brontë would return home from his tours of the village with game donated by the parishioners.

=== Role of the women ===
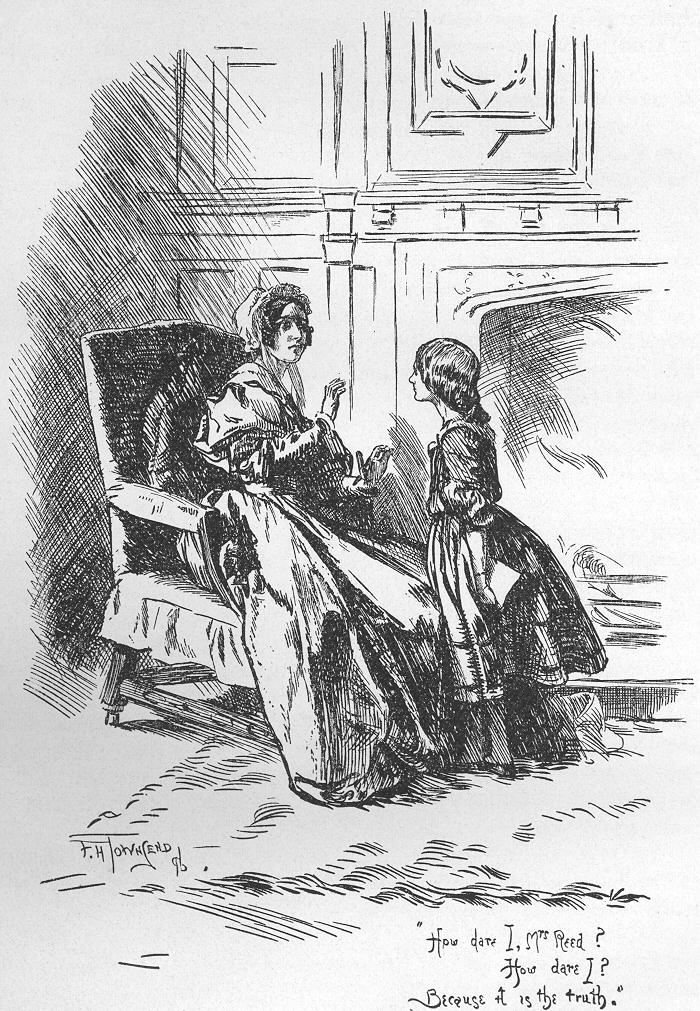
Jane Eyre, pleading her case to her aunt, Mrs Reed, before she is sent to hard service at Lowood (second edition of Jane Eyre, 1847)

According to Robert Southey, poet laureate, in his response to Charlotte, ladies from a good background should be content with an education and a marriage embellished with some decorative talents. Mr Patrick Brontë had one of the characters in his The Maid of Kilarney—without knowing whether it reflected a widespread opinion supporting or condemning it—say, "The education of female ought, most assuredly, to be competent, in order that she might enjoy herself, and be a fit companion for man. But, believe me, lovely, delicate and sprightly woman, is not formed by nature, to pore over the musty pages of Grecian and Roman literature, or to plod through the windings of Mathematical Problems, nor has Providence assigned for her sphere of action, either the cabinet or the field. Her forte is softness, tenderness and grace." In any case, it seemed to contradict his attitude towards his daughters whom he encouraged, even if he was not completely aware of what they did with their time.

== Sisters' place in literature ==
Due to their forced or voluntary isolation, the Brontë sisters constituted a separate literary group that neither had predecessors nor successors. There is not a 'Brontë' line such as exists among authors of realist and naturalist novels, or in poetry, the romantic and the symbolic.

Their influence certainly existed, but it is difficult to define in its totality. Writers who followed them doubtlessly thought about them while they were creating their dark and tormented worlds such as Thomas Hardy in Jude the Obscure or Tess of the d'Urbervilles, or George Eliot with Adam Bede and The Mill on the Floss. There were also more conventional authors such as Matthew Arnold, who in a letter from 1853 says of Charlotte that she only pretends to heartlessness: "nothing but hunger, rebellion and rage". In contrast, Mrs Humphry Ward, author of Robert Elsmere and other morality novels, only finds the didactic among the works of Charlotte, while she appreciates the happy blend of romance and realism in the works of Emily. There is however nothing that could constitute a literary vein.

=== Pilgrimages to Haworth from 1860 ===
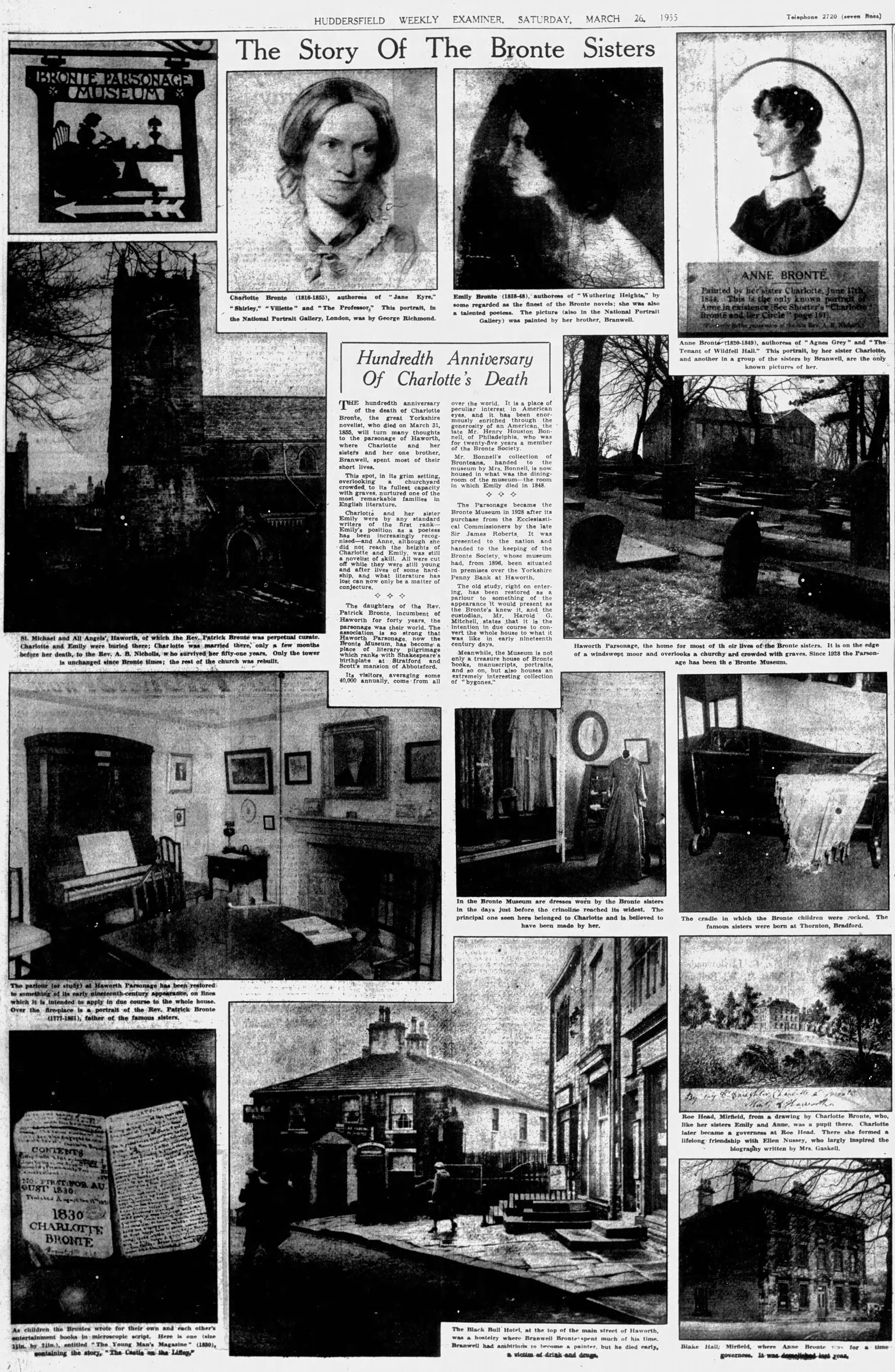
"The Story Of The Bronte Sisters", 1955 newspaper article

By 1860 Charlotte had been dead for five years, and the only people living at the parsonage were Mr. Brontë, his son-in-law, Arthur Bell Nicholls, and two servants. In 1857 Gaskell's biography of Charlotte was published, and though at its first reading, Patrick approved of its commissioning, several months later he expressed doubts. The portrait of Nicholls, founded partly on the confidence of Ellen Nussey, seemed to him to be unjustified. Ellen Nussey, who hated Arthur, insists that his marital claims had perverted Charlotte's writing and she had to struggle against an interruption of her career. It is true that Arthur found Nussey to be too close to his wife, and he insisted that she should destroy her letters—although this never actually happened.

Gaskell's book caused a sensation and was distributed nationwide. The polemic launched by Charlotte's father resulted in a squabble that only served to increase the family's fame.

During Charlotte's lifetime friends and sponsors visited the parsonage, including Sir James and Lady Kay Shuttleworth, Ellen Nussey, Elizabeth Gaskell, John Store Smith, a young writer from Manchester, Bessie Parkes, who recounted her visit to Mrs. Gaskell, and Abraham Holroyd, poet, antiquarian and historian. However, following the publication of the book and the pastor's public remonstrations, the parsonage became a place of pilgrimage for admirers wanting to see it with their own eyes. Charlotte's husband recalled that he had to protect his father-in-law, when on the short path to the church they had to push their way through the crowds of people wanting to reach out and touch the cape of the father of the Brontë girls. The hundreds of visitors became thousands, coming from all over Britain and even from across the Atlantic. Whenever he agreed to meet them, Patrick received them with utmost courtesy and recounted the story of his brilliant daughters, never omitting to express his displeasure at the opinions held about Charlotte's husband.

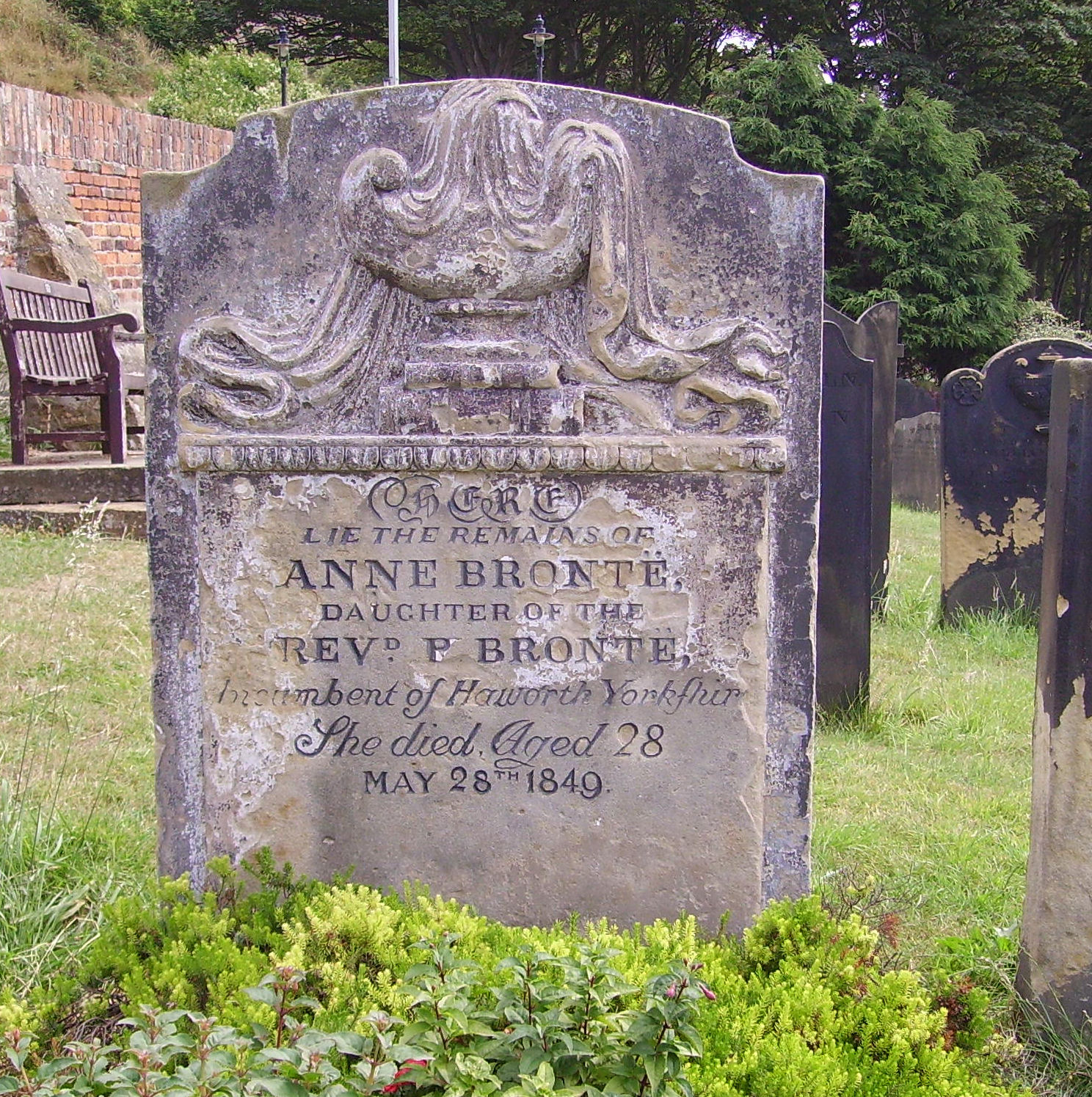
Anne Brontë's grave in Scarborough

The flow of visitors has never abated. Indeed, the parsonage at Haworth received an estimated 88,000 visitors in 2017.

=== Brontë Society ===
The Brontë Parsonage Museum is managed and maintained by the Brontë Society, which organises exhibitions and takes care of the cultural heritage represented by objects and documents that belonged to the family. The society has branches in Australia, Canada, France, Ireland, the Scandinavian countries, South Africa and the USA.

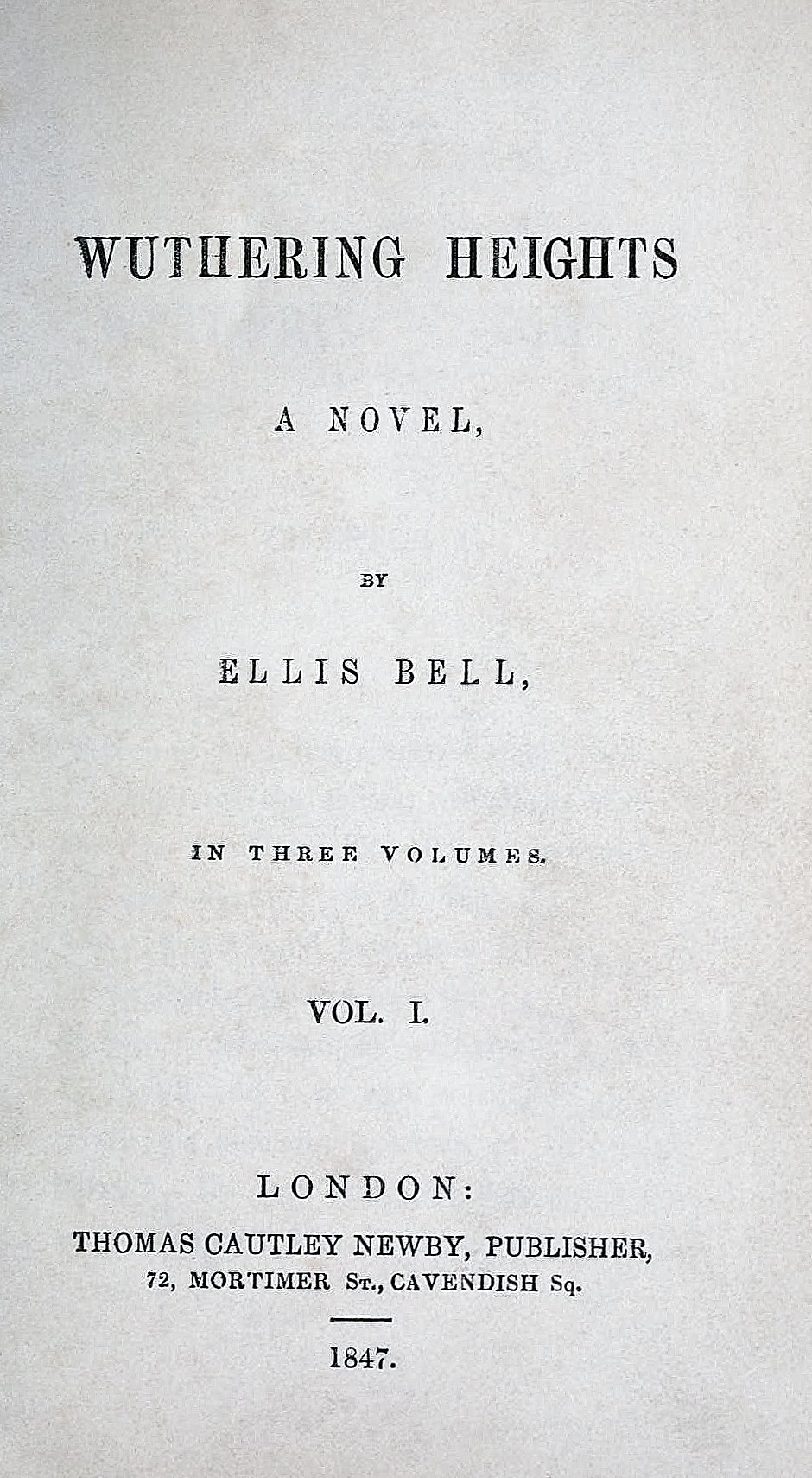
Wuthering Heights, published 1847 under the pseudonym of Ellis Bell (Emily Brontë)

=== Haworth ===
In 1904 Virginia Woolf visited Haworth and published an account in The Guardian on 21 December. She remarked on the symbiosis between the village and the Brontë sisters, and on the fact that utensils and clothes that would normally have disappeared before those who used them, have survived, enables one to better understand their singular presence. She wrote: "Haworth expresses the Brontës; the Brontës express Haworth; they fit like a snail to its shell".

=== Brontë Birthplace ===
The sisters' birthplace in Thornton has been acquired by a community benefit society to preserve it, and as of 2024 there are plans to restore the house for use as a "social and educational space".

=== Brontë Stones ===
In a 2018 project curated and delivered by the University of Huddersfield academic and writer Michael Stewart and the Bradford Literature Festival, four specially-commissioned poems are inscribed on four stones set in the area between the sisters' birthplace and the Haworth parsonage. The Anne Stone has a poem by Jackie Kay and stands in a wildflower meadow behind the Haworth Parsonage; the Charlotte Stone, with a poem by Carol Ann Duffy, is set in the wall of the Brontë Birthplace in Thornton; Emily is remembered in a poem by Kate Bush, known for her 1978 song "Wuthering Heights", which is carved into a rock outcrop of Ogden Kirk on wild moorland above Ogden Water; and a fourth stone, the Brontë Stone, commemorates all three sisters with a poem by Jeanette Winterson and stands in Thornton Cemetery. There are various published walks around the stones, including the 15 mi (24 km) Emily Brontë Walk which is recognised by the Long Distance Walkers Association. The Brontë Stones Project was found to have "increased local engagement with the landscape, regenerated and preserved ancient public rights of ways, and provided an important stimulus to cultural tourism, contributing to the quality of the tourist experience".

== Commemoration in Westminster Abbey ==
A plaque to the three Brontë sisters was erected in Poets' Corner in Westminster Abbey on 8 October 1939, although it was not marked with any ceremony, due to the outbreak of the Second World War. A formal unveiling took place in 1947 but it took until 2024 for the lack of diaeresis over the final e in their names to be noticed and corrected.

== Descendants ==
The line of Patrick Brontë died out with his children, but Patrick's brother had notable descendants, including James Brontë Gatenby, whose most important work was studying Golgi bodies in various animals, including humans, and Peter Gatenby, formerly the medical director of the United Nations.

== In popular culture ==
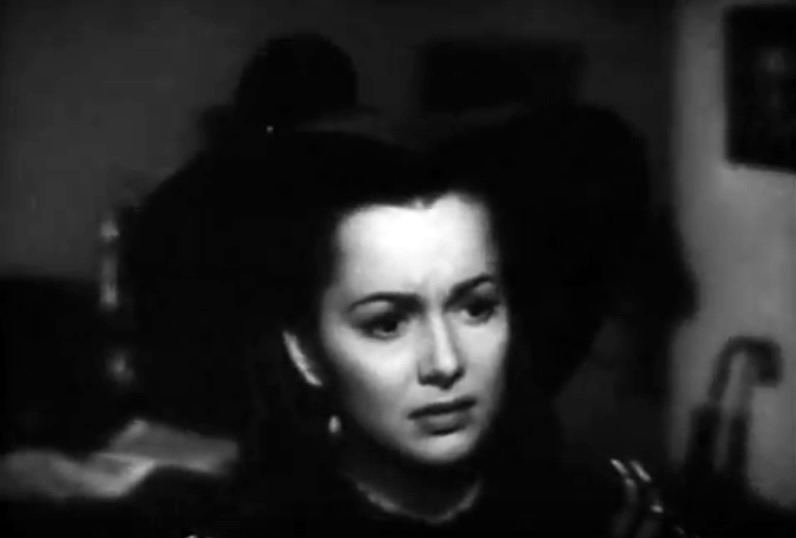
Olivia de Havilland playing the role of Charlotte Brontë in the film Devotion in 1946.

=== Books, comics and graphic novels ===
- In Catherynne M. Valente's young-adult fiction novel The Glass Town Game (2017), "Glass Town turns into a Narnia-like world of its own, and the Brontës find themselves pulled through into their own creation".
- In the comic series Die (2018) by the writer Kieron Gillen and the artist Stephanie Hans, three of the locations on the icosahedron shaped world are Gondal, Angria and Glass Town based on the Brontë juvenilia. In issue #9, Charlotte is a narrative character and reveals the connection between the world of Die, her siblings and their paracosms. Charlotte is also featured on the cover of the issue.
- In the graphic novel Glass Town (2020) by Isabel Greenberg, parts of the Brontë juvenilia are retold and intersected with the lives of four Brontë children—Charlotte, Branwell, Emily and Anne, as they explore the imaginary world they created. "Greenberg blurs fiction and memoir: characters walk between worlds and woo their creators. [...] This is a tale, bookended by funerals, about the collision between dreamlike places of possibility and constrained 19th-century lives".

=== Cinema ===
- In the American short film Three Sisters of the Moors (1944) by John Larkin, Charlotte, Emily and Anne are respectively portrayed by Molly Lamont, Lynne Roberts and Heather Angel.
- In the American film Devotion (1946) by Curtis Bernhardt, which constitutes a biography of the Brontë sisters, Ida Lupino portrays Emily, Olivia de Havilland portrays Charlotte, and Nancy Coleman portrays Anne.
- In the French film Weekend (1967) by Jean-Luc Godard, Emily appears in a scene where one of the protagonists asks for geographical information.
- In the French film Les Sœurs Brontë (1979) by André Téchiné, Isabelle Adjani portrays Emily, Marie-France Pisier portrays Charlotte, Isabelle Huppert portrays Anne, Patrick Magee portrays Patrick Brontë, and Pascal Greggory portrays Branwell Brontë.
- In the Canadian film The Carmilla Movie (2017) by Spencer Maybee, Grace Lynn Kung plays Charlotte and Cara Gee plays Emily.
- In the British film Emily (2022) by Frances O'Connor, Emma Mackey portrays Emily, Alexandra Dowling portrays Charlotte, and Amelia Gething portrays Anne.

=== Dance ===
- The dancer Gillian Lynne presented a composition titled The Brontës (1995).

=== Music ===
- Wuthering Heights is presented as John Lennon's favourite book in The Sky is Everywhere, a young adult fiction novel by author Jandy Nelson.
- The English singer-songwriter Kate Bush released a song titled "Wuthering Heights" in 1978 to critical success. Bush and Emily share the same birthday, 140 years apart.
- A cover version of Bush's song was included on the Pat Benatar album Crimes of Passion.
- Glass Town, a 2021 meta rock musical by Miriam Pultro, features the "Brontë siblings as band members: Anne as the modern, feminist neosoul star; Emily as the alt-rock prodigy; Branwell, singing the blues; and Charlotte, the passionate rocker frontwoman".

=== Objects in outer space ===
- Charlottebrontë is the name of asteroid #39427, discovered at the Palomar Observatory, located on Palomar Mountain in southern California, on 25 September 1973. The asteroids #39428 and #39429 (both discovered on 29 September 1973, at Palomar Observatory) are named Emilybrontë and Annebrontë respectively.
- The 68 km (42 mi) diameter impact crater Brontë on the surface of Mercury is named in honour of the Brontë family.

=== Opera ===
- Wuthering Heights has been the subject of at least three completed operas of the same name: Bernard Herrmann wrote his version between 1943 and 1951, and Carlisle Floyd's setting was premiered in 1958. Frédéric Chaslin also wrote an operatic version. Frederick Delius also started work on a Wuthering Heights opera but abandoned it early.

=== Sport ===
- In 2018 a new horse race at York Racecourse was named the Brontë Cup in honour of the family.

=== Stage productions ===
- The play Brontë (2005), by Polly Teale, explores their lives as well as the characters they created.
- The musical Schwestern im Geiste (2014; Sisters in Spirit), by Peter Lund, is about the Brontës.
- Elizabeth Goudge wrote a two-act stage play, "The Brontës of Haworth", which was staged in 1932, according to Goudge's biographer, Christine Rawlins ( Beyond the Snow: The Life and Faith of Elizabeth Goudge, Thomas Nelson, 2015, p 143). This was included in Goudge's Three Plays: Suomi; The Brontës of Haworth; Fanny Burney (Gerald Duckworth, 1939). Goudge's play was staged again, in June 1934, at the Taylor Institute in London (Rawlins, p 159).
- John Davison published The Brontës of Haworth Parsonage: A Chronicle Play of a Famous Family in Five Acts (J. Garnet Miller, London, 1934).

=== Television ===
- The poet and dramatist Christopher Fry (1907–2005) wrote the telescript for the 1973 television miniseries The Brontës of Haworth. This was filmed at the vicarage in Haworth. It comprises five one-hour episodes, and was nominated for a BAFTA Award.
- In the Family Guy episode "New Kidney in Town", a cutaway gag shows Charlotte and Emily congratulating each other on their literary achievements, while Anne is shown as a crude simpleton (implying her literary contributions were negligible compared to her sisters).
- In the short-lived MTV 2002–2003 animated series Clone High, the Brontë sisters were recurring background characters. In the season finale, "Changes: The Big Prom: The Sex Romp: The Season Finale", they go out as Clone John F. Kennedy's prom dates, along with Catherine the Great and Joan of Arc. Later on, he states that he gave them away to The Three Stooges.
  - The creators of Clone High, Phil Lord and Christopher Miller, previously made a failed pilot entitled "Super X-Treme Mega History Heroes" where it depicts a fictional toy line where the three sister action figures morph together into "Brontësaurus" à la other action figure toys such as Transformers and Power Rangers.
  - In the 2023–24 revival of Clone High, JFK gets back together with the Brontë sisters following his breakup with Joan of Arc in "Sexy Ed". In the season finale, "Clone Alone", the sisters are unable to get through the door to the Clone High College "entrance exam" labyrinth death game before it closes, and JFK is forced to go on without them, indicating that they will be unable to attend the university.
- In the episode "Educating Doug" of the American television series The King of Queens, Doug and Carrie enrol in a course on classic literature to improve their level of sophistication. They are assigned the book Jane Eyre where Doug struggles to get past even the second page.
- In the episode of the CBBC children's television series Horrible Histories entitled "Staggering Storytellers", Charlotte, Emily, Anne and Branwell try to get their work published, forgetting all about the Brontë brother.
- In 2016 a BBC TV drama, To Walk Invisible, was made about the initial success of their novels and the death of Branwell.
- In 2018 a TV sitcom series, Mom, episode titled, "Charlotte Brontë and a Backbone", references being a college educated waitress who knows the difference between Charlotte and Emily.
