= Leben ohne Chris =

- Music: Wolfgang Böhmer
- Lyrics: Peter Lund
- Productions: 2009 Neuköllner Oper Berlin (Germany); 2012 Vienna (Austria)

Leben ohne Chris (Life without Chris) is a musical written in German language by Peter Lund (lyrics), Wolfgang Böhmer (music) and Neva Howard (choreography).

== Synopsis ==
Christopher Bohrmann died two days after his birthday in an accident with a scooter. An angel picks him up and it would actually result in posterity, but Chris has not yet finished with his life. In flashbacks, the audience learns how Chris lived. As an observer Chris can see how his friends process their grief and also a glimpse into the world without Chris being granted.

== World premiere ==
Leben ohne Chris was specifically designed for graduates of the Universität der Künste (University of Arts) by the author and director Peter Lund who has worked here as a professor. The world premiere was the result of a longstanding cooperation between the Universität der Künste and Neuköllner Oper Berlin instead, and it took place there on April, 2nd 2009.

== Further stagings ==
On May, 31st 2012 Leben ohne Chris celebrates its Austrian premiere in Vienna. Directed by Jürgen Kapaun of the Musical Company EMDIS STAGE in co-production with students and graduates of the Vienna Conservatory.

== Reviews ==
In the Critique Leben ohne Chris found an exceptionally friendly and euphoric reception. The Berliner Zeitung spoke of a "great success". Der Tagesspiegel compared Author Peter Lund with Gilbert and Sullivan and the librettist of Jacques Offenbach. The Berliner Morgenpost called the mixture of flashbacks and visions of the future "brilliantly successful". Neues Deutschland praised the "wonderfully bad dialogues, the great music and exciting dance scenes".

== Ensembles and productions ==
=== Performance in Berlin (2009) ===
==== Cast ====
- Conducted by: Hans-Peter Kirchberg / Andreas Altenhof
- Director: Peter Lund
- Choreography: Neva Howard
- Stage: Ulrike Reinhard
- Costumes: Claudio Aguirre / Andrea Schmidt

==== Actors ====
- "Michael" played by Tobias Bieri
- "Chris" played by Christopher Brose
- "Anna" played by Julia Gámez Martin
- "Lisa" played by Magdalena Ganter
- "Nadja" played by Caroline Goebel
- "Birgit" played by Katrin Höft
- "Danny" played by Dennis Jankowiak
- "Henne" played by Stefan Rüh
- "Manu" played by Jasmin Schulz
- "Matze" played by Sebastian Alexander Stipp

=== Performance in Vienna (2012) ===
==== Cast ====
- Conducted by: Gabor Rivo
- Director: Jürgen Capon
- Choreography: Tino Heinze
- Stage: Juergen Kapaun
- Costumes: Jürgen Capon

==== Actors ====
- "Michael" played by Florian Fitz
- "Chris" played by Philip Dürnberger
- "Anna," played by Anna Knott / Ulrike Figgener
- "Lisa" played by Sophia Gorgi / Martina Pallinger
- "Nadja" played by Sarah Kornfeld
- "Birgit" played by Silke Muellner
- "Danny" played by Florian Wischenbart
- "Henne" played by George Hasenzagl
- "Manu" played by Isabel Meili
- "Matze" played by Thomas Rapatz
