= Schwestern im Geiste =

- Music: Thomas Zaufke
- Lyrics: Peter Lund
- Productions: 2014 Neuköllner Oper Berlin (Germany)

Schwestern im Geiste (English: Sisters in Spirit) is a 2014 German-language musical written by Peter Lund (lyrics), with music by Thomas Zaufke and choreography by Neva Howard. The musical was co-produced by the University of Arts Berlin and the Neukölln Opera. The issue of emancipation is told from the perspective of three young women in contemporary Berlin and by the three Brontë sisters living in Victorian England.

== Production ==
Schwestern im Geiste was specifically written for graduates of the Universität der Künste (University of Arts) by the author and director Peter Lund who worked there as a professor. The world premiere was the result of a longstanding cooperation between the Universität der Künste and Neuköllner Oper Berlin, taking place there on March 13, 2014 in the Neukölln Opera, Berlin. The musical is subtitled by the author itself as a "musical journey through time".

== Synopsis ==
The musical parallels the restricted lives of the Brontë sisters with those of three women in 2010s Berlin. The 18-year-old Berlin pupils, Milly and Aydin, are close to graduating from high school. However the two young women do not seem to have anything else in common: Milly tries to enjoy life to the fullest, and the visit of techno parties, the use of designer drugs and noncommittal sex are an expression of her personal freedom and her seemingly self-determined life. Aydin, meanwhile, fears not being able to leave high school, and there is an arranged marriage with her cousin from Bursa on the horizon, a man whom she does not know. While Aydin wants to make her own decisions about her life, she believes her father is more likely to find a good man than if she were to seek offers on her own. The two very different settings of the two students repeatedly provoke violent arguments and criticism of each other's way of life, conversations their teacher, Lotte Birkner, does not tolerate in the classroom, because she is annoyed by feminist debates. She tries to focus the interest of the pupils on the lesson: the literary work of the three Brontë sisters.

The novels and letters left by the Victorian-era English pastor's daughters Charlotte, Anne and Emily Brontë make them pioneers of emancipation. Cut off from the rest of the world, they write about the limited role of women prescribed by civil society and their visions of how it could be better. To be accepted by publishers, the Brontë sisters have to give themselves male pseudonyms. After their release the books are hotly debated by the British public, because of the progressive representation of women's fates, and also their own brother Branwell, who tried himself as a writer as well, is shocked when he recognizes the ambitious attempts of his sisters.

Reading the Brontës' works, the pupils and their teacher realise that what the Brontë sisters have left in their novels and letters, although set in the Victorian era, is quite sudden surprisingly contemporary, and they identify themselves increasingly with the sisters. The young women and the three dead writers become "sisters in spirit".

Ultimately, the Brontës die young, but leave world literature that must be seen as a milestone of emancipation. Addicted to opium and alcohol, and full of despair about his own lack of genius, the brother dies first of tuberculosis. Shortly thereafter Emily follows, and the second-youngest sister Anne a year later. After the death of all of her siblings, Charlotte Brontë gives up the utopia of freedom and self-determination and marries the staid curate Arthur Nicholls, who urges her to stop writing. Even in today's Berlin, in terms of emancipation the story ends rather with a set of knowledge gains than with a "happy ending".

== Reviews ==
- "I hope every casting director and agent in town has been to see this show. [...] the best student performance I have ever seen" (Kurt Gänzl: The Bronte Babes in Berlin. Großes Lob von Kurt Gänzl für Berliner Musical-Student*innen, musical&Co, April 20, 2014.)
- "A glorious staging of the story of the three Brontë sisters!" (Tatiana Michael: livekritik (livekritik.de, 14.03.2014 ))
- "when the whole ensemble plunges singing and dancing into the fray of the opinions of scandal and success, the evening has a real blast" (Peter Hans Göpfert: "Schwestern im Geiste" (kulturradio, 14.3.14))
- "The ladies all have distinctive voices and implement them astonishing under the baton of Hans" -Peter Kirchberg.

== Ensembles and productions ==
=== Performance in Berlin, 2014 ===
13 March to 25 April 2014

==== Cast ====
- Conductor: Hans-Peter Kirchberg / Tobias Bartholmeß
- Choreography: Neva Howard
- Director: Peter Lund
- Stage: Ulrike Reinhard
- Costumes: Anna Hostert

==== Actors ====
- Katharina Abt (Anne Brontë)
- Denis Edelmann (Arthur B. Nicholls )
- Andres Esteban (Branwell Brontë)
- Jaqueline Reinhold (Aydin)
- Sabrina Reischl (Tabby)
- Teresa Scherhag (Lotte Birkner)
- Keren Trüger (Charlotte Brontë)
- Dalma Viczina (Emily Brontë)
- Rubini Zöllner (Milly)

==== Musicians ====
- Katja Reinbold (flute)
- Christian Vogel / Max Teich (clarinet)
- Max Nauta (bass)
- Christin Dross / Sibylle Strobel (violin)
- Anja-Susann Hammer (violoncello)
