= Peter Lund (theatre director) =

German theatre director and author (born 1965)

- Born: 30 December 1965 (age 60); Flensburg, West Germany
- Organizations: Neuköllner Oper, Berlin; Berlin University of the Arts
- Known for: theatre director, playwright, author

Peter Lund (born 30 December 1965) is a German theatre director, playwright, and author, as well as Professor for Acting at Berlin University of the Arts. He has pioneered the New German Musical at the Neuköllner Oper in Berlin.

== Life and career ==
Lund was educated in Flensburg and in Berlin, where he studied architecture. Since 1985 he has been active as a theatre director and author, e.g., in Braunschweig, Hannover, Darmstadt, Bremen, Hamburg, Basel, Innsbruck and Vienna. His focus lies on opera, operetta, and musical theatre. In 1985 he founded the performance ensemble Gruppe Comp&Co. From 1996 to 2004 he was artistic director of the Neuköllner Oper in Berlin. Since 2002, Lund is Professor for Acting at the Musical/Show department at Berlin University of the Arts.

Lund initiated a collaboration of the Berlin University of the Arts Musical/Show department with the Neuköllner Oper in Berlin. The university's graduating class performs a professional production of a new musical penned by Lund in collaboration with composers Thomas Zaufke and Wolfgang Böhmer, among others.

In 2019, Lund and Zaufke produced a feature film version of KOPFKINO, which premiered at Cinema Diverse: The Palm Springs LGBTQ Film Festival in 2019. It was since screened at the Boddinale in Berlin and the Festival Audiovisual Infantil in Mérida, Venezuela.

== List of Selected Works ==
- Hexen (1991), Music: Danny Ashkenasi
- Zarah 47 (1992) Music: diverse
- No Sex (1993), Music: Niclas Ramdohr
- Hexe Hillary geht in die Oper (1997)
- Das Wunder von Neukölln ("The Miracle of Neukölln", 1998), Music: Wolfgang Böhmer
- SommerNachtTraum (2000), Music: Wolfgang Böhmer
- Baby Talk (2000), Music: Thomas Zaufke
- Cinderella passt was nicht (2000), Music: Thomas Zaufke
- Love Bite (2001), Music: Wolfgang Böhmer
- Elternabend (2003), Music: Thomas Zaufke
- Letterland aka „Erwin Kannes – Trost der Frauen“ (2005), Music: Thomas Zaufke
- Held Müller (2006), Music: Thomas Zaufke
- Maja & Co (2006), Music: Jaques Offenbach, Wolfgang Böhmer
- Ugly Ducklings (2007), Music: Thomas Zaufke
- Kauf Dir ein Kind (2007), Music: Thomas Zaufke
- Leben ohne Chris ("Life without Chris", 2009), Music: Wolfgang Böhmer
- Mein Avatar und ich ("My avatar and I", 2010), Music: Thomas Zaufke
- Big Money (2011), Music: Thomas Zaufke
- Frau Zucker will die Weltherrschaft (2011), Music: Wolfgang Böhmer
- Stimmen im Kopf (2013), Music: Wolfgang Böhmer
- Die letzte Kommune ("The Last Commune", 2013), Music: Thomas Zaufke
- Schwestern im Geiste ("Sisters in Mind", 2014), Music: Thomas Zaufke
- Grimm! – Die wirklich wahre Geschichte von Rotkäppchen und ihrem Wolf ("Grimm! – The really true story of Little Red Riding Hood and her wolf", 2014), Music: Thomas Zaufke
- Stella (2016), Music: Wolfgang Böhmer
- KOPFKINO (2017), Music: Thomas Zaufke
- Welcome to Hell (2018), Music: Peter Michael von der Nahmer
- Drachenherz (2019), Music: Wolfgang Böhmer

== Awards ==
In August 2015 Peter Lund was nominated for the German Musical Theatre Award by the German Musical Academy and was honored in the category Best Book for Grimm! on 26 October 2015. In 2016, he was awarded the German Musical Theatre Award for Best Book and Best Lyrics for Stella. In 2019, he won the German Musical Theatre Award for Best Book for Drachenherz.
