= Die letzte Kommune =

- Original language: German
- Written by: Peter Lund
- Characters: Friedrich Puhlmann; Hannes Majowski; Josephine Bouvier; Philipp Paul; Heidi; Charlotte; Michael; Atze; Georg
- Genre: play with music
- Setting: 2013; Berlin (Germany)

Premiere
- Date: 21 September 2013
- Place: Grips-Theater; Berlin, Germany

Die letzte Kommune ('The Last Commune') is a 2013 written play in German language by Peter Lund (lyrics), with music by Thomas Zaufke and was specifically written for GRIPS-Theater, Berlin. The world premiere took place there on September 21, 2013. It's a piece for three generations and was a long-running hit for the house in 2013.

== Synopsis ==
Drama in the house Puhlmann: Grandpa Friedrich has burned his kitchen - almost! With his 78 years, he must have in a nursing home? No, Grandpa Friedrich can not get out of his old apartment. Not for nothing he has hoarded his six-figure nest-egg in ice cream box. With this money, he starts one last great adventure and founds a municipality with his old pal, the wacker proletarian metalworker Hannes Majowski. As in the past, but very different. But then Lotte enters the stage, the granddaughter of Hannes, who wrote a seminar paper on the Kommune 1...

== Ensembles and productions ==
=== Performance in Berlin (GRIPS-Cast) ===
September 21st 2013 to June 25th 2014

==== Cast ====
- Director: Franziska Steiof
- Choreography: Clébio Oliveira
- Drama: Henrik Adler
- Stage: Jan A. Schroeder
- Costumes: Sibylle Meyer

==== Actors ====
- Christian Giese (Hannes Majowski)
- Jumin Hoffmann (Philipp Paul)
- Dietrich Lehmann (Friedrich Puhlmann)
- Regina Lemnitz (Josephine Bouvier)
- Jens Mondalski (Michael)
- Maria Perlick (Charlotte)
- Kilian Ponert (Atze)
- René Schubert (Georg)
- Regine Seidler (Heidi)

==== Musicians ====
- Martin Fonfara (drums)
- Johannes Gehlmann (guitar)
- Robert Neumann (keys)
- Thomas Keller (sax)
- Carsten Schmelzer (bass)

== Reviews ==
- "bridging the gap between generations" (Christian Rakow, Berliner Zeitung vom 23. September 2013)
