= Grimm (musical) =

Grimm!
- Die wirklich Wahre Geschichte von Rotkäppchen und Ihrem Wolf
- Original cast album
- Music: Thomas Zaufke
- Lyrics: Peter Lund
- Productions: 2014 Next Liberty Graz (Austria); 2015 Neuköllner Oper Berlin (Germany)

Grimm! Die wirklich Wahre Geschichte von Rotkäppchen und Ihrem Wolf (The True Story of Little Red Riding Hood and Her Wolf) is a German musical, with lyrics written by Peter Lund, music by Thomas Zaufke, and choreography by Neva Howard. The musical premiered on December 7, 2014, in Graz, Austria, at the Next Liberty Youth Theater.

The German premiere took place as a co-production with the Berlin University of the Arts at the Neuköllner Oper in Berlin, Germany, on March 19, 2015.

== Synopsis ==
Little Red Riding Hood is a 14-year-old girl who is tired of her nickname and wants to be called Dorothea. She lives in a village inhabited by various fairy-tale characters, including mother goat and her children, the three little pigs, the old farm dog and mayor, Sultan, and his son, Rex. Sultan has dark secrets he wants to remain hidden, while one of the pigs aspires to be mayor.

The villagers are united in their fear of the forest and the wolves who lives within it. The wolves and the forest fascinate Little Red Riding Hood in spite of the stories. Eventually, her curiosity prevails and she goes into the woods, where she meets Grimm the wolf and discovers that he is not as frightening as his reputation suggests.

Little Red Riding Hood is drawn to the hermit wolf, and they become friends. The wolf has only ever known Pig Wild (a wild boar) and Granny Owl. Pig Wild believes that a wolf and human cannot be friends, in spite of her own taboo love. Granny Owl, however, supports the friendship of Grimm and Little Red Riding Hood. Moreover, she encourages her to bring him to the village to put an end to the rumors, unaware of the villagers' cruelty.

The villagers become defensive when Little Red Riding Hood brings Grimm to the village.

== Productions ==
Grimm! premiered at the Children's Theater of Opera Graz (Next Liberty) on 7 December 2014. The German premiere took place at the Neuköllner Oper in Berlin on March 19, 2015.

== Cast ==
=== Ensemble in Graz ===
December 7th 2014 to April 27th 2015

==== Cast ====
- Director: Helge Stradner
- Conducted by Maurizio Nobili
- Accompanist: Saša Mutic
- Stage: Marlies Piper
- Costumes: Isabel Toccafondi
- Choreography: Benjamin Louis Rufin
- Image & Video: Bernd Ertl

==== Actors ====
- Sigrid Spörk (Rotkäppchen)
- Christof Messner (Grimm, der junge Wolf)
- Franz Gollner (Sultan, der alte Hofhund)
- Florian Stanek (Rex, sein Sohn)
- János Mischuretz (Schweinchen Schlau)
- Eleftherios-Vinzenz Chladt (Schweinchen Doof / Schweinchen Wild)
- Alisca Baumann (Dicklinde, Schweinchen Dick)
- Jutta Panzenböck (Gisela Geiß / Großmutter Eule)

==== Musicians ====
- Philipp Pluhar (drums / percussion)
- Maurizio Nobili (keyboards, percussion, conductor)
- Saša Mutic (piano, keyboards)
- Andriy Skorobogatko (piano, keyboards)
- Karl Rossmann (trumpet, flugelhorn, electric guitar)
- Gernot Strebl (saxophone, flute, clarinet)
- Reinhard Ziegerhofer (double bass, electric bass)

=== Ensemble in Berlin ===
March 19th to April 14th 2015 with students of Universität der Künste, Berlin

==== Cast ====
- Director: Peter Lund
- Conducted by Hans-Peter Kirchberg / Tobias Bartholmeß
- Choreography: Neva Howard
- Stage and Costumes: Ulrike Reinhard

==== Actors ====
(in alphabetical order)

- Kiara Brunken (Schweinchen Wild)
- Devi-Ananda Dahm (Dorothea, Rotkäppchen)
- Sophia Euskirchen (Oma Eule)
- Fabian-Joubert Gallmeister (Schweinchen Schlau)
- Anthony Curtis Kirby (Rex)
- Dennis Hupka (Didi, (Schweinchen) Doof)
- Katharina Beatrice Hierl (Gisela Geiß)
- Jan-Philipp Rekeszus (Grimm)
- Dennis Weißert (Sultan, der alte Hofhund)
- Feline Zimmermann (Dicklinde, (Schweinchen) Dick)

==== Musicians ====
- Piano: Hans-Peter Kirchberg / Tobias Bartholmeß
- Guitar: Jo Gehlmann / Hossein Yacery Manesh
- Trumpet, piccolo trumpet: Rainer Brennecke
- Reeds: Sidney Pfnür / Karola Elßner
- Synthesizer: Markus Meyer Mitter / Tobias Bartholmeß
- Drums: Stephan Genze
- Bass: Max Nauta

== Songs ==
Act 1

- Prolog
- Geh niemals in den Wald
- So viele Wege
- Sei ein wolf
- Die Geschichte vom Alten Wolf
- Die da im Dorf
- Du bist nicht allein auf der Welt
- Wie ein Märchen entsteht
- Finale 1

Act 2

- Die wirkliche wahre Geschichte vom alten Wolf
- Leben mit Wolf
- Die alte Geschichte
- Der Wolf muss weg
- Grimm
- Du bist mein bester Freund
- Der Schwein-Gehabt-Walzer
- Didis Krise
- Blut geleckt
- Ein besseres Märchen
- Und wenn sie nicht gestorben sind

== Awards and nominations ==
In August 2015, the performance in Graz was nominated in four categories for the German Musical Theatre Award by the German Musical Academy. On October 26, 2015 Peter Lund was awarded in the Best Book category, and Christof Messner won Best Actor.

== Reviews ==
"Lund and Zaufke have created an interesting new family musical which, despite some difficulties, works quite well. The score is wonderful, packed with some great moments, with all sorts of musical influences.“

== See also ==
- Grimms' Fairy Tales
