= Peter Michael von der Nahmer =

Composer and sound researcher based in New York

- Born: April 7, 1977 (age 49); Munich, Germany
- Genres: Contemporary classical, Musical theatre
- Occupations: Composer, sound researcher
- Years active: 1992–present
- Website: petermichaelvondernahmer.com

Peter Michael von der Nahmer (born April 7, 1977, in Munich, Germany) is a composer and sound researcher based in New York City. His American/German/Cuban heritage influences the questions of identity, complexity, and transcendent connection that shape his music. In 2016, McKnight visited the Composer Residency from the American Composers Forum, where he works on musical theater pieces with the people of New Ulm, Minnesota about the history of the city. In June 2017, he received an honorable mention in the New World Composition Challenge with his piano piece "From Here to There", organized by the New York Philharmonic.
