= List of musicals: A to L =

This is a list of musicals, including Broadway, Off-Broadway, and West End musicals, and musicals that premiered in other places, as well as film and television musicals, whose titles fall into the A–L alphabetic range. This is not a complete list of musicals, and is limited to musicals that have their own articles on the English-language Wikipedia.

See List of musicals: M to Z for additional titles.

== 0–9 ==
0–9
Production	Year	Venue/type	Music	Lyrics	Book	Notes	Reference
8 femmes	2002	French film	Various artists	Various artists		Based on the 1958 play of the same name by Robert Thomas. Directed by François Ozon, written by Ozon and Marina de Van.	
9 to 5	2009	Broadway	Dolly Parton		Patricia Resnick	Based on the 1980 film.	
13 + film (2022)	2008	Broadway	Jason Robert Brown		Dan Elish and Robert Horn	The only Broadway musical ever with a cast and band entirely made of teenagers.	
14-18	2014	Flanders	Dirk Brossé	Allart Blom		100 years after World War I, a story of Belgian soldiers defending their country.	
21 Chump Street	2014	Off-Broadway	Lin-Manuel Miranda	Miranda	Miranda	14-minute musical based on a true story told on This American Life.	
The 25th Annual Putnam County Spelling Bee	2005	Off-Broadway and Broadway	William Finn	Finn	Rachel Sheinkin	Performances were partially improvised and featured audience participation (during spelling-bee sequences). Tony Awards for Best Performance by a Featured Actor in a Musical for Dan Fogler and Best Book of a Musical for Sheinkin.	
42nd Street	1933	Film	Harry Warren	Al Dubin		Based on Bradford Ropes' novel of the same name. Directed by Lloyd Bacon and Busby Berkeley, written by Rian James and James Seymour.	
42nd Street	1980	Broadway	Harry Warren	Al Dubin and Johnny Mercer	Michael Stewart and Mark Bramble	Based on the 1933 film.	
44: The Unofficial Unsanctioned Obama Musical	2025	Off-Broadway	Eli Bauman	Eli Bauman	Eli Bauman	Based on the Obama presidency.	
70, Girls, 70	1971	Broadway	John Kander	Fred Ebb	Ebb and Norman L. Martin	Based on the 1958 play Breath of Spring by Peter Coke and primarily starring cast members who are 70 years of age and older.	
101 Dalmatians	2022	West End	Douglas Hodge	Douglas Hodge	Johnny McKnight and Zinnie Harris	The Hundred and One Dalmatians by Dodie Smith	
110 in the Shade	1963	Broadway	Harvey Schmidt	Tom Jones	N. Richard Nash	Based on Nash's 1954 play, The Rainmaker.	
1492 Up to Date	1893	Broadway	Carl Pflueger	R. A. Barnet	Barnet	A burlesque show.	
1600 Pennsylvania Avenue	1976	Broadway	Leonard Bernstein	Alan Jay Lerner	Lerner	Examination of the occupants of the White House, which ran for only 7 performances.	
1776+ film (1972)	1969	Broadway	Sherman Edwards	Edwards	Peter Stone	Based on the events leading up to the signing of the Declaration of Independence, with some dialogue and lyrics adapted from the writings of the Founding Fathers of the United States. Tony Awards included Best Performance by a Featured Actor in a Musical for Ron Holgate and Best Direction of a Musical for Peter Hunt. William Daniels, who starred as John Adams, was nominated for Best Featured Actor but declined the nomination in protest, for being ruled ineligible for Best Actor due to his name not being above the title of the show.	
1789: Les Amants de la Bastille	2012	French	Rod Janois, Jean-Pierre Pilot, Olivier Schultheis, William Rousseau and Dove Attia	Attia and Vincent Baguian	Attia and François Chouquet	Based on the French Revolution.	

== A ==
A
Production	Year	Venue/type	Music	Lyrics	Book	Notes	Reference
A... My Name Is Alice	1984	Off-Broadway	David Zippel, Winnie Holzman and Lucy Simon	Zippel, Holzman and Simon	Joan Micklin Silver and Julianne Boyd	Revue with an all-female cast. Revised versions staged as ''A... My Name Is Still Alice in 1992 and A... My Name Will Always Be Alice in 1995 .	
Aaron Slick from Punkin Crick	1952	Film	Ray Evans and Jay Livingston	Evans and Livingston		Based on the 1919 play by Walter Benjamin Hare. Directed and written by Claude Binyon.	
ABBAcadabra + West End (1983)	1983	French television	Benny Andersson and Björn Ulvaeus	Alain Boublil and Daniel Boublil (French production); David Wood, Mike Batt, Don Black (UK production)	Boublil and Boublil	Adaptation of classic fairy tales set to the music of ABBA with new French lyrics.	
About Face	1952	Film	Peter DeRose and various artists	Charles Tobias and various artists		Directed by Roy Del Ruth; written by Peter Milne.	
About Town	1906	Broadway	Melville Ellis and Raymond Hubbell	Joseph W. Herbert	Herbert		
Absolute Beginners	1986	Film	Gil Evans (score) and various artists (songs)	Various artists		Based on the novel by Colin MacInnes. Directed by Julien Temple; written by Richard Burridge, Christopher Wicking, and Don Macpherson.	
Abyssinia	1906	Broadway	Will Marion Cook and Bert Williams	Jesse A. Shipp and Alex Rogers	Jesse A. Shipp and Alex Rogers		
Abyssinia	1987	Broadway	Ted Kociolek	James Racheff	Racheff and Kociolek	Based on the novel Marked by Fire, by Joyce Carol Thomas.	
Ace	2006	Off-Off-Broadway	Richard Oberacker	Robert Taylor and Oberacker	Taylor and Oberacker		
Ace of Clubs	1950	West End	Noël Coward	Coward	Coward		
Acorn Antiques	2005	West End	Victoria Wood	Wood	Wood	Based on a series of sketches performed on the television show Victoria Wood as Seen on TV.	
Across the Universe	2007	Film	The Beatles (John Lennon, Paul McCartney, George Harrison, Ringo Starr) (songs). Elliot Goldenthal (score)	The Beatles		Jukebox musical Film directed by Julie Taymor; written by Dick Clement and Ian La Frenais.	
The Act	1977	Broadway	John Kander	Fred Ebb	George Furth	Directed by Martin Scorsese (his only work on Broadway to date). Tony Award for Best Actress in a Musical for Liza Minnelli.	
The Addams Family	2010	Broadway	Andrew Lippa	Lippa	Marshall Brickman and Rick Elice	Based on the cartoons by Charles Addams. Includes The Addams Family Theme composed by Vic Mizzy. The 2011 touring version introduced several modifications to the plot and song list.	
Adding Machine	2008	Off-Broadway	Joshua Schmidt	Jason Loewith and Schmidt	Loewith and Schmidt	Based on the 1923 play by Elmer Rice.	
Adèle	1913	Broadway	Jean Briquet and Adolf Phillipp	Paul Hervé	Hervé	English adaptation by Philipp and Edward A. Paulton of a French musical.	
Adonis	1884	Broadway	Edward E. Rice and John Eller	Rice and Eller	William Gill		
The Adventures of Elmo in Grouchland	1999	Film	Various artists	Various artists		Film featuring the Sesame Street Muppets. Directed by Gary Halvorson; written by Mitchell Kriegman and Joey Mazzarino.	
The Adventures of Marco Polo	1956	Television	Nikolai Rimsky-Korsakov, adapted by Clay Warnick and Mel Pahl	Edward Eager		Part of the Max Liebman Presents series of original television musicals. Directed by Liebman, written by Neil Simon, Billy Friedberg, and Will Glickman. Reunited Alfred Drake and Doretta Morrow of Kismet.	
The Adventures of Tom Sawyer	2001	Broadway	Don Schlitz	Schlitz	Ken Ludwig	Based on the 1876 novel by Mark Twain.	
Affair in Trinidad	1952	Film	Lester Lee, Bob Russell, various artists	Lee and Russell		Directed by Vincent Sherman; written by Oscar Saul, James Gunn, Virginia Van Upp, and Berne Giler.	
The Affairs of Dobie Gillis	1953	Film	Various artists	Various artists		Directed by Don Weis; written by Max Shulman. Notable for the first film appearance of Bob Fosse.	
Afgar	1919	West End	Charles Cuvillier	Douglas Furber	Fred Thompson and Worton David		
Africana	1934	Broadway	Donald Heyward	Heyward	Heyward		
After Midnight	2013	Broadway	Various artists	Various artists	Jack Viertel ("conceived by") and Langston Hughes ("selected text by")	Jazz jukebox musical revue based on the 2011 Encores! revue Cotton Club Parade and comprising songs written by Duke Ellington, Harold Arlen and others.	
After the Ball	1953	West End	Noël Coward	Coward	Coward	Based on the 1892 play Lady Windermere's Fan by Oscar Wilde.	
Aida	2000	Broadway	Elton John	Tim Rice	Linda Woolverton, Robert Falls and David Henry Hwang	Based on the 1871 opera by Giuseppe Verdi. Tony Awards for Best Original Score (John and Rice), Best Actress in a Musical for Heather Headley. Notable song: Written in the Stars.	
Ain't Misbehavin' + Television (1982)	1978	Broadway	Fats Waller and various artists	Waller and various artists	Murray Horwitz and Richard Maltby, Jr.	Revue comprising songs written and/or popularized by Waller. Tony Awards for Best Musical, Best Featured Actress (Nell Carter), and Best Director (Richard Maltby, Jr.)	
Ain't Supposed to Die a Natural Death	1971	Broadway	Melvin Van Peebles	Van Peebles	Van Peebles		
Ain't Too Proud	2017	Broadway	The Temptations and various artists	The Temptations and various artists	Dominique Morisseau	Jukebox biomusical based on the lives and featuring the songs of the Temptations.	
Aladdin	1958	Television	Cole Porter	Porter		Based on the folktale "Aladdin" from the One Thousand and One Nights and presented on DuPont Show of the Month on CBS. Directed by Ralph Nelson; written by S. J. Perelman. Porter's last score.	
Aladdin	1979	West End	Sandy Wilson	Wilson	Wilson	Based on the folktale "Aladdin" from the One Thousand and One Nights.	
Aladdin + Broadway (2011) and film (2019)	1992	Animated film	Alan Menken	Howard Ashman and Tim Rice		Based on the folktale "Aladdin" from the One Thousand and One Nights. Notable Songs: "A Whole New World" and "Friend Like Me".	
Alexander's Ragtime Band	1938	Film	Irving Berlin			Jukebox musical featuring 23 Berlin songs including two written for the film ("Now it Can be Told" and "My Walking Stick"). Directed by Henry King; written by Kathryn Scola and Lamar Trotti.	
Ali Baba Goes to Town	1937	Film	Various artists	Various artists		Directed by David Butler; written by Harry Tugend and Jack Yellen.	
Alice at the Palace	1982	Television	Elizabeth Swados	Swados	Swados and Lewis Carroll	Filmed version for PBS of Alice in Concert with revisions and new cast. External link: Alice at the Palace on BroadwayHD.	
Alice by Heart	2019	Off-Broadway	Steven Sater	Duncan Sheik	Sheik and Jessie Nelson	Based on Lewis Carroll's 1865 book Alice's Adventures in Wonderland.	
Alice in Concert	1980	Off-Broadway	Elizabeth Swados	Swados	Swados and Lewis Carroll	Based on Carroll's books Alice's Adventures in Wonderland (1865) and Through the Looking-Glass (1871). Meryl Streep starred.	
Alice in Wonderland	1886	West End	Walter Slaughter	Lewis Carroll, Henry Savile Clarke and Aubrey Hopwood	Clarke	Based on Carroll's books Alice's Adventures in Wonderland (1865) and Through the Looking-Glass (1871).	
Alice in Wonderland	1951	Animated film	Oliver Wallace, Sammy Fain, Bob Hilliard, and various artists	Lewis Carroll, Fain, Hilliard, and various artists		Based on Carroll's books Alice's Adventures in Wonderland(1865) and Through the Looking-Glass (1871).	
Alice in Wonderland	1976	Adult film	Jack Stern	Stern		Based on Lewis Carroll's 1865 book Alice's Adventures in Wonderland. Directed by Bud Townsend; written by Bill Osco and Bucky Searles. Originally released as a softcore film but later re-edited to include explicit sexual scenes. Adapted into an adult Off-broadway musical with an entirely new score in 2004.	
Alice in Wonderland	1985	Television	Steve Allen	Lewis Carroll and Allen		Based on Carroll's books Alice's Adventures in Wonderland (1865) and Through the Looking-Glass (1871). Directed by Harry Harris, written by Paul Zindel.	
Alice in Wonderland (or What's a Nice Kid Like You Doing in a Place Like This?)	1966	Animated television film	Charles Strouse	Lee Adams		Based on Lewis Carroll's 1865 book Alice's Adventures in Wonderland. Directed by Alex Lovy, written by Bill Dana.	
Alice Through the Looking Glass	1966	Animated television film	Mark Charlap	Elsie Simmons		Based on Lewis Carroll's 1871 book Through the Looking-Glass. Directed by Alan Handley, written by Albert Simmons.	
Alice with Kisses	1964	Off-Broadway	Sammy Fields, Joseph L. Blankenship, and Nevett Bartow.	Blankenship	Blankenship	Closed in previews. Memorialized in the 1967 film The Producers as one of the flop window cards tacked on Max Bialystock's wall.	
Alice's Adventures in Wonderland	1972	Film	John Barry	Lewis Carroll and Don Black		Based on Carroll's books Alice's Adventures in Wonderland (1865) and Through the Looking-Glass (1871). Directed and written by William Sterling.	
Alive and Kicking	1950	Broadway	Hoagy Carmichael and various artists	Paul Francis Webster and various artist	I. A. L. Diamond	Revue.	
All 4 One	2001	Off-West End	John Trent Wallace	Kevin John Heuston	Heuston		
All Aboard	1913	Broadway	E. Ray Goetz and Malvin M. Franklin	Goetz	Mark Swan		
All American	1962	Broadway	Charles Strouse	Lee Adams	Mel Brooks		
All Dogs Go to Heaven	1989	Animated film	Ralph Burns	Charles Strouse, Al Kasha, Joel Hirschhorn, and T.J. Kuenster		Directed by Don Bluth; written by David N. Weiss.	
All Dogs Go to Heaven 2	1996	Animated film	Barry Mann	Cynthia Weil		Sequel to the 1989 film All Dogs Go to Heaven. Directed by Larry Leker and Paul Sabella; written by Kelly Ward & Mark Young and Arne Olsen.	
All Hands on Deck	1961	Film	Cyril Mockridge	Donald R. Morris	Jay Sommers		
All in Fun	1940	Broadway	Baldwin Bergerson and John Rox			Revue.	
All in Love	1961	Off-Broadway	Jacques Urbont	Bruce Geller	Geller		
All Out of Love	2018	Manila	Air Supply	Air Supply	Jim Millan		
All Shook Up	2005	Broadway	Elvis Presley	Various artists	Joe DiPietro	jukebox featuring songs written and/or sung by Elvis Presley.	
All That Jazz	1979	Film	Ralph Burns	Various artists	Robert Alan Aurthur and Bob Fosse		
All the Fun of the Fair	2008	West End	David Essex	Essex	Jon Conway	jukebox featuring the songs of David Essex.	
All the King's Horses	1935	Film	Edward Horan	Horan	Edmund H. North, Frank Tuttle and Frederick Stephani	All the King's Horses by Lawrence Clark, Max Giersberg, Frederik Herendeen and Edward Horan	
Allegiance	2012	Broadway	Jay Kuo	Jay Kuo	Marc Acito, Jay Kuo, Lorenzo Thione	Regional Premiere 2012, Broadway 2015	
Allegro	1947	Broadway	Richard Rodgers	Oscar Hammerstein II	Hammerstein		
An Alligator Named Daisy	1955	Film	Stanley Black and Sam Coslow, and various artists		Jack Davies		
Alma, Where Do You Live?	1910	Broadway	Jean Briquet	George V. Hobart	Hobart		
Almost Famous	2019	Broadway	Tom Kitt	Cameron Crowe	Crowe	Based on the 2000 film of the same name.	
Alone at Last	1914	Broadway	Franz Lehár and various artists	Matthew Woodward and various artists			
Along Fifth Avenue	1949	Broadway	Gordon Jenkins and various artists	Tom Adair and various artists		Revue.	
Altar Boyz	2005	Off-Broadway	Gary Adler and Michael Patrick Walker	Adler and Walker	Kevin Del Aguila		
Amazing Grace	2012	Broadway	Christopher Smith	Christopher Smith	Christopher Smith, Arthur Giron	Regional Premiere 2012. Broadway 2015	
Ambassador	1972	Broadway	Don Gohman	Hal Hackady	Don Ettlinger and Anna Marie Barlow		
Amélie	2017	Broadway	Daniel Messé	Daniel Messé and Nathan Tyson	Craig Lucas	Based on the 2001 romantic comedy film of the same name.	
Amen Corner	1983	Broadway	Garry Sherman	Peter Udell	Philip Rose and Peter Udell		
America Is Hard to See	2018	Off-Broadway	Priscilla Holbrook	Holbrook	Travis Russ	Documentary play with music.	
America Kicks Up Its Heels	1983	Off-Broadway	William Finn	Finn	Charles Rubin		
The American Astronaut	2001	Film	Cory McAbee and Billy Nayer Show	McAbee and Billy Nayer Show		Directed and written by McAbee.	
American Idiot	2010	Broadway	Green Day	Billie Joe Armstrong	Armstrong and Michael Mayer		
An American in Paris	1951	Film	George Gershwin	Ira Gershwin	Alan Jay Lerner		
An American in Paris	2015	Broadway	George Gershwin	Ira Gershwin	Craig Lucas	Based on the 1951 musical film of the same name.	
The American Mall	2008	Television	Various artists			MTV film with original songs. Directed by Shawn Ku; written by Margaret Oberman.	
American Pop	1981	Animated film	Various artists (songs); Lee Holdridge (score)	Various artists		Jukebox musical paralleling the history of American popular music. Directed by Ralph Bakshi; written by Ronni Kern.	
American Psycho	2016	Broadway	Duncan Sheik	Duncan Sheik	Roberto Aguirre-Sacasa	Based on the controversial 1991 novel by Bret Easton Ellis.	
An American Tail	1986	Animated film	James Horner, Barry Mann, and various artists	Cynthia Weil and various artists		Directed by Don Bluth; written by Judy Freudberg & Tony Geiss. Notable song: "Somewhere Out There".	
An American Tail: Fievel Goes West	1991	Animated film	James Horner and various artists	Will Jennings and various artists		Sequel to An American Tail (1986). Directed by Phil Nibbelink and Simon Wells; written by Flint Dille.	
Americana	1926	Broadway	Con Conrad and various artists	J. P. McEvoy and various artists	McEvoy	Revue including songs by George and Ira Gershwin, Arthur Schwartz, and others.	
America's Sweetheart	1931	Broadway	Richard Rodgers	Lorenz Hart	Herbert Fields		
The Amorous Flea	1964	Off-Broadway	Bruce Montgomery	Montgomery	Jerry Devine		
Amour	2002	Broadway	Michel Legrand	Didier Van Cauwelaert	Jeremy Sams		
Amphitryon	1935	Film	Franz Doelle	C. Amberg and Bruno Balz	Reinhold Schünzel	Based on the stage play Amphytrion by Molière, Titus Maccius Plautus and Heinrich von Kleist.	
Anastasia	1997	Animated film	Stephen Flaherty	Lynn Ahrens		Based on the legend of Grand Duchess Anastasia Nikolaevna of Russia, which claims that she escaped the execution of her family. Directed by Don Bluth and Gary Goldman; written by Susan Gauthier, Bruce Graham, Bob Tzudiker, and Noni White.	
Anastasia	2017	Broadway	Stephen Flaherty	Lynn Ahrens	Terrence McNally	Based on the 1956 film and 1997 animated musical films of the same name, with a new book and 16 new songs in addition to six songs from the animated movie.	
Anchors Aweigh	1945	Film	Georgie Stoll	Various artists	Natalie Marcin		
& Juliet	2019	West End	Max Martin and others	Max Martin and others	David West Read		
And the Angels Sing	1944	Film	Jimmy Van Heusen	Johnny Burke (lyricist)		Directed by George Marshall; written by Melvin Frank and Norman Panama. Notable song: "It Could Happen to You".	
And the World Goes 'Round	1991	Off-Broadway	John Kander	Fred Ebb	—N/a	Revue comprising the songs of Kander and Ebb.	
André Charlot's Revue of 1924	1924	Broadway Revue	Various artists	Various artists	—N/a	Revue.	
Andy Hardy's Private Secretary	1941	Film					
Angel	1978	Broadway	Gary Geld	Peter Udell	Udell and Ketti Frings		
Angel in the Wings	1947		Bob Hilliard and Carl Sigman	Hilliard and Sigman	Hank Ladd, Ted Luce, Paul Hartman, and Grace Hartman.	Revue. Notable song: "Civilization"	
Angélique, Marquise des Anges	1995	Paris	Michel Magne, Nadia Golon, and Eddie Barclay	Magne, Golon, and Barclay	Alain Decaux	Based on the Angelique novels by Anne and Serge Golon.	
Ani: A Parody	2014	Off-Broadway	Clark Baxtresser and Pierce Siebers	Matt and Nick Lang	M. and N. Lang		
Animal Crackers + film (1930)	1928	Broadway	Bert Kalmar and Harry Ruby	Kalmar and Ruby	George S. Kaufman and Morrie Ryskind		
Ankles Aweigh	1955	Broadway	Sammy Fain	Dan Shapiro	Guy Bolton and Eddie Davis		
Anna and the Apocalypse	2017	Film	Roddy Hart and Tommy Reilly	Hart and Reilly		Directed by John McPhail; written by Alan McDonald and Ryan McHenry.	
Anna Karenina	1992	Broadway	Daniel Levine	Peter Kellogg	Kellogg	Based on Leo Tolstoy's novel of the same name	
Anne & Gilbert	2005	Victoria, Prince Edward Island	Jeff Hochhauser, Nancy White and Bob Johnston	Hochhauser, White and Johnston	Hochhauser, White and Johnston	Based on Lucy Maud Montgomery's novels Anne of Avonlea and Anne of the Island.	
Anne of Green Gables	1965	Charlottetown, Prince Edward Island	Norman Campbell	Don Harron, Campbell, Elaine Campbell and Mavor Moore	Harron	Based on Lucy Maud Montgomery's novel of the same name.	
Annie + film (1982) + film (1999) + film (2014)	1977	Broadway	Charles Strouse	Martin Charnin	Thomas Meehan	Notable songs: "Tomorrow" and "It's the Hard Knock Life"	
Annie Get Your Gun + film (1950)	1946	Broadway	Irving Berlin		Herbert Fields and Dorothy Fields	Notable song: "There's No Business Like Show Business".	
Annie Warbucks	1993	Off-Broadway	Charles Strouse	Martin Charnin	Thomas Meehan	Sequel to Annie.	
Another Cinderella Story	2008	Film	Various artists	Various artists		Directed by Damon Santostefano; written by Erik Patterson and Jessica Scott.	
Anya	1965	Broadway	Robert Wright and George Forrest	Wright and Forrest	George Abbott and Guy Bolton		
Anyone Can Whistle	1964	Broadway	Stephen Sondheim		Arthur Laurents		
Anything Goes	1934	Broadway	Cole Porter	Porter	Guy Bolton and P. G. Wodehouse	Notable songs: "Anything Goes", "You're the Top" and "I Get a Kick out of You".	
Applause	1970	Broadway	Charles Strouse	Lee Adams	Betty Comden and Adolph Green		
The Apple	1980	Film	Kobi Recht	George Clinton and Iris Recht		Directed by Menahem Golan; written by Golan and Recht.	
The Apple Tree	1966	Broadway	Jerry Bock	Sheldon Harnick	Bock, Harnick and Jerome Coopersmith		
April in Paris	1952	Film	Vernon Duke and LeRoy Prinz	Various artists	Jack Rose		
April Love	1957	Film	Sammy Fain (songs); Alfred Newman (score)	Paul Francis Webster		Based on the 1941 novel Phantom Filly by George Agnew Chamberlain. Directed by Henry Levin; written by Winston Miller.	
An Arabian Girl and 40 Thieves	1899	Broadway	W. H. Batchelor, John J. Braham, Jessie Williams and Meyer Lutz	J. Cheever Goodwin			
Arabian Nights	1954	Off-Broadway	Carmen Lombardo and John Jacob Lœb	Lombardo and Lœb			
The Arcadians	1909	West End	Lionel Monckton and Howard Talbot	Arthur Wimperis	Mark Ambient and Alexander M. Thompson		
Are You With It?	1945	Broadway	Harry Revel	Arnold B. Horwitt	Sam Perrin and George Balzer	Based on the novel Slightly Perfect by George Malcolm-Smith.	
Are You with It?	1948	Film	Inez James and Sidney Miller	James and Miller		Based on the Broadway musical of the same name, but with a revised plot and an entirely new score by James and Miller. Directed by Jack Hively; written by Oscar Brodney.	
Argentine Nights	1940	Film	Frank Skinner	Various artists	J. Robert Bren and Gladys Atwater		
Ari	1971	Broadway	Walt Smith	Leon Uris		Based on the novel Exodus by Leon Uris.	
The Aristocats	1970	Animated film	George Bruns	Various Artists	Ken Anderson, Larry Clemmons, Eric Cleworth, Vance Garry, Julius Svendsen, Frank Thomas, and Ralph Wright	Based on characters created by Tom McGowan and Tom Rowe.	
The Ark	1998	Off-Broadway	Michael McLean	McLean and Kevin Kelly	McLean and Kelly		
Arms and the Girl	1950	Broadway	Morton Gould	Dorothy Fields	Herbert Fields and Fields		
Around the Clock	1906	road musical with stop on Broadway	Lee Orean Smith	J. Sebastian Hiller	Steve B. Cassin		
Around the World	1946	Broadway	Cole Porter	Porter	Orson Welles		
Arthur! Arthur!	1969	Film	Harry Robertson	Various artists	Julian Symons		
Artists and Models	1937	Film	Various artists	Various artists	Frank Tashlin, Herbert Baker, and Hal Kanter	Notable songwriters: Burton Lane, Harold Arlen, and Victor Young. Directed by Raoul Walsh; written by Eugene Thackrey and Keene Thompson.	
Artists and Models	1955	Film	Harry Warren and Jack Brooks	Various artists		Notable song: "Innamorata". Based on the 1942 play Rock-a-Bye Baby! by Michael Davidson and Norman Lessing. Directed by Frank Tashlin; written by Herbert Baker, and Hal Kanter.	
An Artist's Model	1895	West End	Sidney Jones	Harry Greenbank and various artists	Owen Hall		
As Long as They're Happy	1954	Film	Stanley Black	Alan Melville	Melville		
As the Girls Go	1948	Broadway	Jimmy McHugh	Harold Adamson	William Roos		
As Thousands Cheer	1933	Broadway	Irving Berlin		Moss Hart	Revue loosely based on the sections of a newspaper of the time. One of the rare "topical" revues to be frequently revived, due to the many songs that became American standards. Notable songs: "Easter Parade", "Heat Wave", Supper Time.	
Aspects of Love	1990	West End	Andrew Lloyd Webber	Don Black and Charles Hart	Lloyd Webber	Notable song: "Love Changes Everything".	
Assassins	1990	Off-Broadway	Stephen Sondheim		John Weidman	Premiered on Broadway in 2004.	
At Home Abroad	1935	Broadway	Arthur Schwartz	Howard Dietz	Various artists (sketches)	Revue.	
At Long Last Love	1975	Film	Cole Porter	Porter		Jukebox musical featuring songs written by Porter. Directed and written by Peter Bogdanovich. A critical and commercial flop when it was released; a revised version became a cult film due to television airings and has risen in critical esteem since. Musical numbers were performed and filmed live.	
At the Circus	1939	Film	Harold Arlen	Arlen	Irving Brecher		
At the Drop of a Hat	1956	Off-West End	Donald Swann	Michael Flanders	Swann and Flanders	Revue also produced on Broadway in 1959.	
At the Drop of Another Hat	1963	Off-West End revue	Donald Swann	Michael Flanders	Swann and Flanders	Revue also produced on Broadway in 1966.	
At War with the Army	1950	Film	Joseph J. Lilley	Lilley	James Allardice and Fred Finklehoffe		
Athena	1954	Film	Hugh Martin and Ralph Blane	Martin and Blane	William Ludwig and Leonard Spigelgass		
The Athenian Touch	1964	Off-Broadway	Willard Straight	David Eddy	J. Albert Fracht and Arthur Goodman		
Atlantic City	1944	Film	Various artists	Various artists		Directed by Ray McCarey; written by Doris Gilbert, Frank Gill Jr. and George Carleton Brown.	
Aunt Sally	1933	Film	Harry M. Woods	Woods	Guy Bolton		
Autant en emporte le vent	2003	Paris	Gérard Presgurvic	Presgurvic		Based on the novel Gone with the Wind by Margaret Mitchell.	
Avenue Q	2003	Broadway	Robert Lopez and Jeff Marx	Lopez and Marx	Jeff Whitty	Notable songs: "It Sucks to Be Me", "Everyone's a Little Bit Racist" and "There's a Fine, Fine Line".	

== B ==
B
Production	Year	Venue/type	Music	Lyrics	Book	Notes	Reference
Babes in Arms	1937	Broadway	Richard Rodgers	Lorenz Hart	Rodgers and Hart	Notable songs: "Where or When", "My Funny Valentine", "The Lady Is a Tramp", "Johnny One Note" and "I Wish I Were in Love Again".	
Babes in Toyland	1903	Broadway	Victor Herbert	Glen MacDonough	MacDonough		
Babes on Broadway	1941	Film	Various artists	E.Y. Harburg and Ralph Freed			
Babette	1903	Broadway	Victor Herbert	Harry B. Smith	Smith		
Baby	1983	Broadway	David Shire	Richard Maltby, Jr.	Sybille Pearson		
Baby It's You!	2011	Broadway	Various Artists	Various Artists	Floyd Mutrox and Colin Escott		
Baby Talk	2000	Neuköllner Opera	Thomas Zaufke	Peter Lund		Das Kinder-Krieg Musical	
Back to the 80's	2001	Australian	Neil Gooding	Gooding	Gooding		
Back to the Future	2020	West End	Alan Silvestri	Glen Ballard	Bob Gale	Back to the Future	
Bad Cinderella	2021	West End	Andrew Lloyd Webber	David Zippel	Emerald Fennell (Original Book) & Alexis Scheer (Adaptation)	Based on the fairy tale Cinderella	
Bad Girls	2006	West End	Kath Gotts	Gotts	Maureen Chadwick and Ann McManus	Based on the ITV1 television series Bad Girls.	
Bad Habits of 1926	1926	Broadway revue	Manning Sherwin	Arthur Herzog, Jr.	—N/a		
Bajour	1964	Broadway	Walter Marks	Marks	Ernest Kinoy	Based on Joseph Mitchell's short stories, The Gypsy Women and The King of the Gypsies.	
Baker Street	1965	Broadway	Marian Grudeff, Raymond Jessel and Jerry Bock	Grudeff, Jessel and Sheldon Harnick	Jerome Coopersmith	Based on the Sherlock Holmes stories of Arthur Conan Doyle	
The Baker's Wife	1989	West End	Stephen Schwartz	Schwartz	Joseph Stein	Aimed at a Broadway run in 1976, but closed during try-outs.	
The Balkan Princess	1910	West End	Paul Rubens	Rubens and Arthur Wimperis	Frederick Lonsdale and Frank Curzon		
Ball im Savoy	1932	German operetta	Paul Abraham	Alfred Grünwald and Fritz Löhner-Beda	Abraham		
Ballad for Bimshire	1963	Off-Broadway	Irving Burgie	Burgie	Burgie and Loften Mitchell		
Ballroom	1978	Broadway	Billy Goldenberg	Alan Bergman and Marilyn Bergman	Jerome Kass		
Bambi	1942	Animated film	Frank Churchill and Edward H. Plumb	Churchill and Plumb	Larry Morey		
The Band	2017	West End	Take That	Take That	Tim Firth		
Band Waggon	1940	Film	Various artists	Various artists			
The Band Wagon	1931	Broadway revue	Arthur Schwartz	Howard Dietz	—N/a	Notable songs: "I Love Louisa", "Hoops" and "Dancing in the Dark".	
Bandanna Land	1908	Broadway	Will Marion Cook	Jesse A. Shipp and Alex Rogers	Shipp and Rogers		
The Band's Visit	2016	Broadway	David Yazbek	Yazbek	Itamar Moses	Based on the film of the same name.	
Bandstand	2015	Broadway	Richard Oberacker	Oberacker and Robert Taylor	Oberacker and Taylor		
Banjo Boy	2008	Regional	Randolph Hobler	Randolph Hobler	Randolph Hobler	Based on the life of Meredith Willson.	
Banjo Eyes	1941	Broadway	Vernon Duke	John La Touche and Harold Adamson	Joseph Quinlan and Izzy Ellinson		
Bar Mitzvah Boy	1978	West End	Jule Styne	Don Black	Jack Rosenthal		
Barbarella	2004	Austrian	Dave Stewart	Stewart	Stewart	Based on the 1968 film.	
The Bardy Bunch	2014	Off-Broadway	Various Artists	Various Artists	Stephen Garvey		
Bare	2012	Off-Broadway	Damon Intrabartolo	Jon Hartmere	Hartmere	New, revised version of Bare: A Pop Opera.	
Bare: A Pop Opera	2000	Off-Broadway	Damon Intrabartolo	Jon Hartmere, Jr.	Intrabartolo and Hartmere, Jr.	Notable song: "Portrait of a Girl".	
Bare Facts of 1926	1926	Broadway revue	Charles M. Schwab	Henry Myers	Stuart Hamill		
Barefoot Boy with Cheek	1947	Broadway	Sidney Lippman	Sylvia Dee	Max Shulman		
The Barkleys of Broadway	1949	Film	Harry Warren and George Gershwin	Ira Gershwin	Betty Comden, Adolph Green and Sidney Sheldon		
Barnum	1980	Broadway	Cy Coleman	Michael Stewart	Mark Bramble		
Baron Trenck	1912	Broadway	Felix Albini	Frederick F. Schrader	Henry Blossom		
The Baroness Fiddlesticks	1904	Broadway	Emil Bruguiere	George De Long	De Long		
Bashville	1983	West End	Denis King	Benny Green	David William	Adapted from The Admirable Bashville by George Bernard Shaw	
Bat Boy	2001	Off-Broadway	Laurence O'Keefe	O'Keefe	Keythe Farley and Brian Flemming		
Bat Out of Hell	2017	West End	Jim Steinman	Steinman	Steinman		
Bathhouse	2006	Off-Broadway	Tim Evanicki; Esther Daack	Tim Evanicki; Esther Daack	Tim Evanicki; Esther Daack		
Bats	1983	Australian	Ian Dorricott	Simon Denver	Dorricott and Denver		
The Battle of Paris	1929	Film	Cole Porter, Jay Gorney and Dick Howard	Howard Dietz and Porter	Gene Markey		
Bayside!	2013	Off-Broadway	Bob and Tobly McSmith	Bob and Tobly McSmith	Bob and Tobly McSmith	A musical parody of the television show Saved by the Bell.	
Be More Chill	2015, 2018, 2019	Broadway	Joe Iconis	Joe Iconis	Joe Tracz		
Be Yourself	1930	Film	Hugo Riesenfeld	Riesenfeld	Joseph Jackson		
Beaches	2014, 2026	Broadway	Mike Stoller	Iris Rainer Dart	Dart, Thom Thomas		
Beat the Band	1942	Broadway	Johnny Green	George Marion Jr.	Marion and George Abbott	Basis for the 1947 musical film Beat the Band. No relation to the radio program of the same name.	
Beatlemania	1977	Broadway revue	The Beatles	The Beatles	Bob Gill, Robert Rabinowitz and Lynda Obst		
Beau	2025	Off-Broadway	Ethan D. Packhar and Douglas Lyons	Lyons	Lyons		
Beautiful and Damned	2004	West End	Les Reed and Roger Cook	Reed and Cook	Kit Hesketh-Harvey	Based on The Beautiful and the Damned by F. Scott Fitzgerald	
The Beautiful Game	2000	West End	Andrew Lloyd Webber	Ben Elton	Lloyd Webber and Elton		
A Beautiful Noise: The Neil Diamond Story	2022	Broadway	Neil Diamond	Diamond	Anthony McCarten	The life and music of Neil Diamond	
Beautiful: The Carole King Musical	2014	Broadway	Gerry Goffin, Carole King, Barry Mann and Cynthia Weil	Goffin, King, Mann and Weil	Douglas McGrath		
Beauty and the Beast + film (1991) + film (2017)	1994	Broadway	Alan Menken	Howard Ashman and Tim Rice	Linda Woolverton	Based on animated Walt Disney film of the same name. Notable songs: "Be Our Guest" and "Beauty and the Beast".	
The Beauty Shop	1914	Off-Broadway	Charles J. Gebest	Rennold Wolf			
The Beauty Spot	1909	Off-Broadway	Reginald De Koven	Joseph W. Herbert	Herbert		
Beauty World	1988	Singaporean	Dick Lee	Michael Chiang	Chiang		
Because of Winn-Dixie	2013	Regional	Duncan Sheik	Sheik	Nell Benjamin	Based on the 2005 film of the same name.	
Because You're Mine	1952	Film	Johnny Green	Green	Ruth Brooks Flippen and Sy Gomberg		
Becoming Nancy	2019	Regional	George Stiles	Anthony Drewe	Elliot Davis		
Bed and Sofa	1996	Off-Broadway	Polly Penn	Laurence Klavan	Klavan		
Bedknobs and Broomsticks + film (1971)	2019	Touring Production	Richard M. Sherman, Robert B. Sherman	Sherman, Sherman	Brian Hill		
A Bedtime Story	1933	Film	Ralph Rainger	Rainger	Benjamin Glazer and Nunnally Johnson		
Before After	2010	Japan	Stuart Matthew Price	Price	Timothy Knapman		
Beetlejuice	2018	Broadway	Eddie Perfect	Perfect	Scott Brown and Anthony King	Based on the 1988 film of the same name.	
The Beggar Student	1882	German operetta	Carl Millöcker	Camillo Walzel and Richard Genée	Millöcker		
Beggar's Holiday	1946	Broadway	Duke Ellington	John La Touche	La Touche		
The Beggar's Opera	1728	West End opera	John Gay	Gay	Gay		
Beguiled Again	1997	Revue	Richard Rodgers	Lorenz Hart	Various		
Behind the Iron Mask	2005	West End	John Robinson	Robinson	Colin Scott and Melinda Walker	The show draws inspiration from the Man in the Iron Mask.	
Bel-Ami	2014	Off-West End	Alex Loveless	Loveless	Loveless	A contemporary musical adaptation of the book of the same name.	
Bell Bottom George	1943	Film	Harry Bidgood	Bidgood	Edward Dryhurst and Peter Fraser		
Bella: An American Tall Tale	2016	Off-Broadway	Kristen Childs	Kristen Childs	Kristen Childs		
La belle Hélène	1864	Paris opera bouffe	Jacques Offenbach	Henri Meilhac and Ludovic Halévy	Offenbach		
La Belle Meunière	1948	Film	Tony Aubin	Aubin	Marcel Pagnol		
The Belle of Brittany	1908	Opera	Howard Talbot and Marie Horne	Percy Greenbank	Leedham Bantock and P.J. Barrow		
The Belle of New York	1897	Broadway	Gustave Kerker	Hugh Morton	Morton		
Belle of the Nineties	1934	Film	Arthur Johnston	Johnston	Mae West		
Belle of the Yukon	1944	Film	Arthur Lange	Lange	Houston Branch		
Belles belles belles	2003	French jukebox	Claude François, Jean-Pierre Bourtayre, Carolin Petit	Claude François, Daniel Moyne	Daniel Moyne, Jean-Pierre Bourtayre	Based on songs by Claude François.	
Bells Are Ringing	1956	Broadway	Jule Styne	Betty Comden and Adolph Green	Comden and Green	A film was released in 1960.	
Belmont Varieties	1932	Broadway revue	Various artists	Various artists	—N/a		
The Beloved Vagabond	1936	Film	Darius Milhaud	Milhaud	William John Locke		
Ben Franklin in Paris	1964	Broadway	Mark Sandrich, Jr. and Jerry Herman	Sidney Michaels	Michaels		
Bend It Like Beckham	2015	West End	Howard Goodall	Charles Hart	Gurinder Chadha and Paul Mayeda Berges		
Bernarda Alba	2006	Off-Broadway	Michael John LaChiusa	LaChiusa	LaChiusa		
Bernardine	1957	Film	Lionel Newman and Johnny Mercer	Newman and Mercer	Mary Chase and Theodore Reeves		
Besame Mucho	2005	Mexican jukebox	José María Vitier (arranger)	Various artists	Consuelo Garrido, Lorena Maza and Victor Weinstock	Based on Bolero songs of the 1920s Mexico.	
Best Foot Forward	1941	Broadway	Hugh Martin and Ralph Blane	Martin and Blane	John Cecil Holm		
The Best Little Whorehouse Goes Public	1994	Broadway	Carol Hall	Hall	Larry L. King and Peter Masterson		
The Best Little Whorehouse in Texas + film (1982)	1978	Broadway	Carol Hall	Hall	Larry L. King and Peter Masterson		
The Best Things in Life Are Free	1956	Film	Lionel Newman	Lew Brown and Buddy DeSylva	William Bowers and Phoebe Ephron		
Betjemania	1976	West End	John Gould	John Betjeman	David Benedictus and Gould		
Bette! Divine Madness	1979	Broadway revue	Various artists	Various artists	Jerry Blatt, Bette Midler and Bruce Vilanch		
Bette Midler's Clams on the Half Shell	1975	Broadway revue	Various artists	Various artists	Bruce Vilanch, Bill Hennessy and Jerry Blatt		
Better Man	2024	Film	Batu Sener (score) and Robbie Williams (songs)	Robbie Williams and various artists		Directed by Michael Gracey, written by Simon Gleeson, Oliver Cole and Michael Gracey.	
The Better 'Ole	1917	West End	Herman Darewski	Percival Knight and James Heard	Bruce Bairnsfather and Arthur Elliot		
Better Tunes	1922	Broadway revue					
Betty	1915	West End	Paul Rubens and Ernest Steffan	Adrian Ross and Rubens	Frederick Lonsdale and Gladys Unger		
Betty Blue Eyes	2011	West End	George Stiles	Anthony Drewe	Ron Cowen and Daniel Lipman	Based on A Private Function by Alan Bennett and Malcolm Mowbray.	
Between the Devil	1937	Broadway	Arthur Schwartz	Howard Dietz	Dietz		
Between the Lines	2017	Off-Broadway	Elyssa Samsel and Kate Anderson	Elyssa Samsel and Kate Anderson	Timothy Allen McDonald		
Betwixt!	2008	Off West End	Ian McFarlane	McFarlane	McFarlane		
Beyond the Fringe	1961	West End revue	Various artists	Various artists	Alan Bennett, Peter Cook, Jonathan Miller and Dudley Moore		
Big	1996	Broadway	David Shire	Richard Maltby, Jr.	John Weidman		
The Big Bang Theory: A Pop-Rock Musical Parody	2019	Off-Broadway	Karlan Judd	Judd	Judd	A musical parody of the television show The Big Bang Theory.	
The Big Beat	1958	Film	Henry Mancini	Mancini	David P. Harmon		
Big Boy	1925	Broadway	James F. Hanley and Joseph Meyer	Buddy DeSylva	Harold Atteridge		
The Big Broadcast	1932	Film	Various artists	Various artists	William Ford Manley		
The Big Broadcast of 1936	1935	Film	Various artists	Various artists	Walter DeLeon, Francis Martin and Ralph Spence		
The Big Broadcast of 1937	1936	Film	Various artists	Various artists	Walter DeLeon and Francis Martin		
The Big Broadcast of 1938	1938	Film	Various artists	Various artists	Walter DeLeon, Francis Martin and Ken Englund		
Big Fella	1937	Film	G. H. Clutsam and Will Grosz	Clutsam and Grosz	Ingram D'Abbes and Fenn Sherie		
Big Fish	2013	Broadway	Andrew Lippa	Lippa	John August	Based on the film of the same name.	
The Big Gay Musical	2009	Film	Rick Crom	Crom	Fred M. Caruso		
The Big One-Oh!	2019	Off-Broadway	Doug Besterman	Dean Pitchford	Timothy Allen McDonald	Based on the book of the same name.	
Big River	1985	Broadway	Roger Miller	Miller	William Hauptman		
Big Tent	2007	Off-Broadway	Ben Cohn and Sean McDaniel	Cohn and McDaniel	Jeffery Self	A musical based on the life of Tammy Faye Bakker.	
Billboard Girl	1932	Film			Lewis R. Foster, Harry McCoy, Earle Rodney and John A. Waldron		
Billie	1928	Broadway	George M. Cohan	Cohan	Cohan		
Billie	1965	Film	Dominic Frontiere	Frontiere	Ronald Alexander		
Billion Dollar Baby	1945	Broadway	Morton Gould	Betty Comden and Adolph Green	Comden and Green		
Billy	1974	West End	John Barry	Don Black	Dick Clement and Ian La Frenais		
The Billy Barnes Revue	1959	Off-Broadway revue	Billy Barnes	Barnes	Bob Rodgers		
Billy Elliot	2005	West End	Elton John	Lee Hall	Hall	Based on the film of the same name	
Billy Noname	1970	Off-Broadway	Johnny Brandon	Brandon	William Wellington Mackey		
The Bing Boys Are Here	1916	West End revue	Nat D. Ayer	Clifford Grey	George Grossmith, Jr. and Fred Thompson		
The Bing Boys on Broadway	1918	West End revue	Nat D. Ayer	Clifford Grey	George Grossmith, Jr. and Fred Thompson		
The Bing Girls Are There	1917	West End revue	Nat D. Ayer	Clifford Grey	George Grossmith, Jr. and Fred Thompson		
The Biograph Girl	1980	West End	David Heneker	Heneker and Warner Brown	Brown		
Birds of Paradise	1987	Off-Broadway	David Evans	Winnie Holzman	Evans and Holzman		
Bitter Sweet	1929	West End operetta	Noël Coward	Coward	Coward		
Black and Blue	1985	French revue	Various artists	Various artists	—N/a		
The Black Crook	1866	Broadway	Thomas Baker, Giuseppe Operti and George Bickwell	Theodore Kennick	Charles M. Barras		
Black Friday	2019	Los Angeles	Jeff Blim	Blim	Matt Lang and Nick Lang	Produced by StarKid Productions.	
The Black Rider	1990	German	Tom Waits	Waits	William S. Burroughs		
Blackbirds of 1928	1928	Broadway revue	Jimmy McHugh	Dorothy Fields	—N/a	Notable song: "Doin' the New Low-Down".	
Das Blaue Vom Himmel	1932	Film	Paul Abraham	Abraham	Max Kolpé and Billy Wilder		
Bless the Bride	1947	West End	Vivian Ellis	A. P. Herbert	Herbert		
Bless You All	1950	Broadway revue	Harold Rome	Rome	—N/a		
Blitz!	1962	West End	Lionel Bart	Bart	Bart and Joan Maitland		
The Blonde in Black	1903	Broadway	Gustav Kerker	Harry B. Smith	Smith		
Die Blonde Nachtigall	1930	Film	Willy Kollo and Otto Stransky	Kollo and Stransky	Walter Schlee and Walter Wassermann		
Blondel	1983	West End	Stephen Oliver	Tim Rice	Rice		
Ein blonder Traum	1932	Film	Werner R. Heymann	Heymann	Walter Reisch and Billy Wilder		
Blondie Goes Latin	1941	Film	Leo Arnaud	Arnaud	Karen DeWolf and Richard Flournoy		
Blood Brothers	1983	West End	Willy Russell	Russell	Russell	Notable songs: "Marilyn Monroe" and "Tell Me It's Not True".	
Bloody Bloody Andrew Jackson	2008	Off-Broadway	Michael Friedman	Friedman	Alex Timbers		
Bloomer Girl	1944	Broadway	Harold Arlen	E. Y. Harburg	Sig Herzig and Fred Saidy		
Blossom Time	1921	Austrian operetta	Franz Schubert	Alfred Maria Willner and Heinz Reichert	Willner and Reichert		
The Blue Angel	1930	Film	Friedrich Hollaender	Robert Liebmann	Heinrich Mann		
Blue Hawaii	1961	Film	Joseph J. Lilley	Lilley	Allan Weiss		
Blue Holiday	1945	Broadway revue	Al Moritz	Moritz	—N/a		
The Blue Kitten	1922	Broadway	Rudolf Friml	Otto Harbach and William Carey Duncan	Harbach and Duncan		
The Blue Mazurka	1927	West End operetta	Franz Lehár	Leo Stein and Bela Jenbach	Stein and Jenbach		
Blue of the Night	1933	Film	Various artists	Various artists			
The Blue Paradise	1915	Broadway	Edmund Eysler and Sigmund Romberg	Herbert Reynolds	Edgar Smith		
Blue Rhythm	1931	Film	W. C. Handy	Handy			
Blue Skies	1946	Film	Irving Berlin				
Bluebell in Fairyland	1901	West End	Walter Slaughter	Aubrey Hopwood and Charles H. Taylor	Seymour Hicks		
Blues in the Night	1941	Film	Heinz Roemheld	Roemheld	Edwin Gilbert, Elia Kazan and Robert Rossen		
Blues in the Night	1982	Off-Broadway revue	Various artists	Various artists	—N/a		
Boccaccio	1936	Film	Franz Doelle	Doelle	Emil Burri and Walter Forster		
The Body Beautiful	1958	Broadway	Jerry Bock	Sheldon Harnick	Joseph Stein and Will Glickman		
Body of Water	2014	Off-Broadway	Jim Walker	Walker	Tony Kienitz		
The Bodyguard + film (1992)	2012	West End jukebox	Various artists	Various artists	Alexander Dinelaris	Based on the film of the same name.	
The Bohemian Girl	1843	West End opera	Michael William Balfe	Alfred Bunn	Balfe		
Bombay Dreams	2002	West End	A. R. Rahman	Don Black	Meera Syal and Thomas Meehan		
Bombo	1921	Broadway	Sigmund Romberg	Harold Atteridge	Atteridge		
Bonnie & Clyde	2009	Broadway	Frank Wildhorn	Don Black	Ivan Menchell		
Boobs!	2003	Off-Broadway	Ruth Wallis	Wallis	Steve Mackes and Michael Whaley		
Boogie Nights	1998	West End	Various artists	Various artists	Jon Conway		
The Book of Mormon	2011	Broadway	Robert Lopez, Trey Parker and Matt Stone	Lopez, Parker and Stone	Lopez, Parker and Stone		
Boop! The Musical	2023	Broadway	David Foster	Susan Birkenhead	Bob Martin		
Boots and Saddles	1937	Film	Raoul Kraushaar	Kraushaar	Jack Natteford		
Boots! Boots!	1934	Film			Jack Cottrell and George Formby		
Born to Dance	1936	Film	Cole Porter	Porter	Jack McGowan and Sid Silvers	Notable song: "I've Got You Under My Skin".	
Bottoms Up	1934	Film	Howard Jackson	Jackson	David Buster, Buddy DeSylva and Sid Silvers		
The Boy Friend	1954	West End	Sandy Wilson	Wilson	Wilson		
The Boy from Oz	2003	Broadway	Peter Allen	Allen	Nick Enright and Martin Sherman		
The Boy in the Dress	2019	British	Robbie Williams, Guy Chambers and Chris Heath	Williams, Chambers and Heath	Mark Ravenhill	Based on David Walliams' children's book of the same name	
Boy Meets Boy	1975	Off-Broadway	Bill Solly	Solly	Solly and Donald Ward		
The Boy Who Heard Music	2007	Workshop production	Pete Townshend and Rachel Fuller	Townshend and Fuller	Townshend	Adaptation of The Who's rock opera Wire and Glass.	
The Boys from Syracuse	1938	Broadway	Richard Rodgers	Lorenz Hart	George Abbott	Notable songs: "Falling in Love with Love" and "This Can't Be Love".	
Bran Nue Dae	1990	Australian	Jimmy Chi and Kuckles	Chi and Kuckles	Chi and Kuckles		
Bravo Giovanni	1962	Broadway	Milton Schafer	Ronny Graham	A. J. Russell		
Breakfast at Tiffany's	1966	Broadway	Bob Merrill	Merrill	Edward Albee	Aimed at Broadway but closed during previews.	
Brewster's Millions	1935	Film	Marr Mackie	Mackie	Arthur Wimperis		
The Bridges of Madison County	2014	Broadway	Jason Robert Brown		Marsha Norman	Based on the novel of the same name.	
Brigadoon	1947	Broadway	Frederick Loewe	Alan Jay Lerner	Lerner	Notable song: "Almost Like Being in Love".	
Bright Eyes	1934	Film	Richard A. Whiting and Samuel Kaylin	Whiting and Kaylin	William Conselman		
Bright Lights, Big City	2004	Off-Broadway	Paul Scott Goodman	Goodman	Goodman		
Bright Lights of 1944	1943	Broadway revue	Jerry Livingston	Mack David	Norman Anthony and Charles Sherman		
Bright Star	2016	Broadway	Edie Brickell and Steve Martin	Edie Brickell	Steve Martin		
Bring Back Birdie	1981	Broadway	Charles Strouse	Lee Adams	Michael Stewart		
Bring in 'da Noise, Bring in 'da Funk	1996	Broadway revue	Daryl Waters, Zane Mark and Ann Duquesnay	Reg E. Gaines, George C. Wolfe and Duquesnay	Gaines		
Bring It On	2012	Broadway	Lin-Manuel Miranda and Tom Kitt	Amanda Green and Miranda	Jeff Whitty	Based on the 2000 film.	
Bring on the Girls	1945	Film	Robert E. Dolan	Dolan	Karl Tunberg, Darrell Ware and Pierre Wolff		
Bring Your Smile Along	1955	Film	Paul Mason Howard	Howard	Blake Edwards and Richard Quine		
Britannia of Billingsgate	1933	Film	Various artists	Various artists	Christine Jope-Slade and Sewell Stokes		
Broadway Gondolier	1935	Film	Heinz Roemheld	Roemheld	Sig Herzig, Yip Harburg and Hanns Kräly		
Broadway Hostess	1935	Film	Ray Heindorf and Heinz Roemheld	Heindorf and Roemheld	George Bricker		
The Broadway Melody	1929	Film	Nacio Herb Brown, George M. Cohan and Willard Robison	Brown, Cohan and Robison	Edmund Goulding, Norman Houston and James Gleason		
Broadway Melody of 1936	1935	Film	Nacio Herb Brown	Brown	Harry W. Conn, Moss Hart, Jack McGowan and Sid Silvers		
Broadway Melody of 1938	1937	Film	Nacio Herb Brown	Arthur Freed	Jack McGowan		
Broadway Melody of 1940	1940	Film	Cole Porter, Roger Edens and Walter Ruick	Porter, Edens and Ruick	Jack McGowan and Dore Schary		
Broadway Through a Keyhole	1933	Film	Alfred Newman	Newman	C. Graham Baker and Gene Towne		
A Broken Idol	1909	Broadway	Egbert Van Alstyne	Harry Williams	Hal Stephens		
A Bronx Tale	2016	Broadway	Alan Menken	Glenn Slater	Chazz Palminteri	Based on the play of the same name.	
Brooklyn	2004	Broadway	Mark Schoenfeld and Barri McPherson	Schoenfeld and McPherson	Schoenfeld and McPherson		
Bubble Boy	2013	American	Cinco Paul	Cinco Paul	Cinco Paul and Ken Daurio	Based on 2001 film Bubble Boy	
Bubbling Brown Sugar	1976	Broadway revue	Various artists	Various artists	Loften Mitchell		
The Bubbly Black Girl Sheds Her Chameleon Skin	2000	Off-Broadway	Kirsten Childs	Kirsten Childs	Kirsten Childs		
Buck Benny Rides Again	1940	Film	Victor Young	Young	Arthur Stinger, Edmund Beloin and William Morrow		
Buck Privates	1941	Film	Charles Previn	Previn	Arthur T. Horman		
Buddies	1919	Broadway	B. C. Hilliam	Hilliam	George V. Hobart		
Buddy – The Buddy Holly Story	1989	West End jukebox	Various artists	Various artists	—N/a		
Buena Vista Social Club	2025	Broadway	Various artists	Various artists	Marco Ramirez	Based on the album of the same name.	
Bugs Bunny on Broadway	1990	Broadway	Carl Stalling and Milt Franklyn	Stalling and Franklyn	George Daugherty	Based on the TV series Looney Tunes.	
Bugsy Malone	1983	West End	Paul Williams	Williams	Alan Parker	Based on the 1976 film of the same name. Notable songs: "Fat Sam's Grand Slam" and "So You Wanna Be a Boxer?".	
Bullets over Broadway	2014	Broadway revue	Various artists	Various artists	Woody Allen	Based on the film of the same name.	
Bumblescratch	2016	West End	Robert J. Sherman	Sherman	Sherman	One night only, red-carpet gala, charity benefit performance at the Adelphi Theatre in benefit of the Variety Club of Great Britain, commemorating the 350th anniversary of the Great Fire of London in 1666. Notable songs: "Music of the Spheres", "Adorable Me!", "Melbourne Bumblescratch", "At Least A Rat 'As Got An Excuse"	
Bundle of Joy	1956	Film			Robert Carson, Norman Krasna, Arthur Sheekman and Felix Jackson		
The Bunyip	1917	Australia	Vince Courtney, Herbert De Pinna		Ella Airlie		
Burlesque + film (2010)	2024	Manchester/Glasgow	Christina Aguilera, Sia, Diane Warren, Todrick Hall, and Jess Folley	Aguilera, Sia, Warren, Hall, and Folley	Steve Antin		
Bus Stop	1956	Film	Ken Darby, Cyril J. Mockridge, Alfred Newman and Lionel Newman	Darby, Mockridge, Newman and Newman	George Axelrod and William Inge		
By Jeeves	1975	West End	Andrew Lloyd Webber	Alan Ayckbourn	Lloyd Webber and Ayckbourn		
By Jupiter	1942	Broadway	Richard Rodgers	Lorenz Hart	Rodgers and Hart	Based on The Warrior's Husband by Julian F. Thompson.	
By the Beautiful Sea	1954	Broadway	Arthur Schwartz	Dorothy Fields	Herbert Fields and Fields		
By the Light of the Silvery Moon	1953	Film	Gus Edwards and Max Steiner	Edwards and Steiner	Booth Tarkington		
By the Way	1925	Off-Broadway revue	Vivian Ellis	Graham John	—N/a		
Bye Bye Birdie	1960	Broadway	Charles Strouse	Lee Adams	Michael Stewart	Notable songs: "A Lot of Livin' to Do", "Kids" and "Put on a Happy Face".	

== C ==
C
Production	Year	Venue/type	Music	Lyrics	Book	Notes	Reference
Cab Calloway's Hi-De-Ho	1933	Film	Cab Calloway	Calloway	Milton Hockey and Fred Rath		
Cabalgata	1949	Broadway revue	Ramon Bastida	Bastida	—N/a		
Cabaret + film (1972)	1966	Broadway	John Kander	Fred Ebb	Joe Masteroff	Notable songs: "Cabaret", "Maybe This Time" and "Willkommen".	
Cabin in the Sky + film (1943)	1940	Broadway	Vernon Duke	John La Touche	Lynn Root		
The Caddy	1953	Film	Joseph J. Lilley	Lilley	Danny Arnold and Edmund Hartmann		
La Cage aux Folles	1983	Broadway	Jerry Herman	Herman	Harvey Fierstein	Notable song: "I Am What I Am".	
Calamity Jane	1953	Film	Sammy Fain	Paul Francis Webster	James O'Hanlon	Notable song: "Secret Love".	
Call Me Madam + film (1953)	1950	Broadway	Irving Berlin		Howard Lindsay and Russel Crouse	Star vehicle for Ethel Merman.	
Call Me Mister	1946	Broadway revue	Harold Rome	Rome	—N/a		
Call of the Flesh	1930	Film	William Axt	Axt	John Colton and Dorothy Farnum		
Calypso Heat Wave	1957	Film	Arthur Morton	Morton	David Chandler		
Camelot + film (1967)	1960	Broadway	Frederick Loewe	Alan Jay Lerner	Lerner	Notable songs: "Camelot", "If Ever I Would Leave You", "I Loved You Once in Silence" and "The Lusty Month of May".	
Camp	2003	Film	Various artists	Various artists	Todd Graff		
Camp Rock	2008	Film	David Kitay	David Kitay	Various artists		
Camp Rock 2: The Final Jam	2010	Film	Christopher Lennertz	Christopher Lennertz	Various artists		
Can-Can + film (1960)	1953	Broadway	Cole Porter	Porter	Abe Burrows	Notable song: "I Am in Love".	
Candide	1956	Broadway	Leonard Bernstein	Richard Wilbur	Lillian Hellman	Notable song: "Glitter and Be Gay".	
The Candy Shop	1909	Broadway	John L. Golden	Golden	George V. Hobart		
Cannibal	1993	Film	Trey Parker and Rich Sanders	Parker and Sanders	Parker	Originally known as Alferd Packer: The Musical.	
Can't Help Singing	1944	Film	Jerome Kern	E. Y. Harburg	Lewis R. Foster and Frank Ryan		
Can't Stop the Music	1980	Film	Various artists	Various artists	Allan Carr and Bronte Woodard	Starred the Village People, Steve Guttenberg, Valerie Perrine and Caitlyn Jenner (credited as Bruce Jenner). (Note: Jenner changed her name due to gender transition in 2015.)	
Canterbury Tales	1968	West End	John Hawkins and Richard Hill	Nevill Coghill	Martin Starkie and Coghill		
The Capeman	1998	Broadway	Paul Simon	Simon and Derek Walcott	Simon and Walcott		
Le capitaine Craddock	1931	Film	Werner R. Heymann	Heymann	Hans Müller		
El Capitan	1896	Broadway	John Philip Sousa	Charles Klein and Tom Frost	Klein		
Captain January	1936	Film	Lew Pollack	Pollack	Sam Hellman, Gladys Lehman and Harry Tugend		
Captain Jinks	1925	Broadway	Lewis E. Gensler and Stephen Jones	B.G. DeSylva and Laurence Schwab	Frank Mandel		
Captain Louie	1988	Off-Broadway	Stephen Schwartz	Schwartz	Anthony Stein		
Captain of the Guard	1930	Film	Charles Wakefield Cadman	Cadman	Houston Branch		
The Card	1973	West End	Tony Hatch and Jackie Trent	Hatch and Trent	Keith Waterhouse and Willis Hall		
Carefree	1938	Film	Irving Berlin		Allan Scott and Ernest Pagano	Starred Fred Astaire and Ginger Rogers.	
Carib Song	1945	Broadway	Baldwin Bergersen	William Archibald	Archibald		
Carmelina	1979	Broadway	Burton Lane	Alan Jay Lerner	Joseph Stein and Lerner		
Carmen	2007	Czech	Frank Wildhorn	Jack Murphy	Norman Allen		
Carmen Jones	1943	Broadway	Georges Bizet	Oscar Hammerstein II	Hammerstein II	Featured the music from the opera Carmen.	
Carnival!	1961	Broadway	Bob Merrill	Merrill	Michael Stewart	Notable song: "Love Makes the World Go 'Round".	
Carnival in Flanders	1953	Broadway	Jimmy Van Heusen	Johnny Burke	Preston Sturges	Notable song: "Here's That Rainy Day".	
Carolina Blues	1944	Film	George Duning	Duning	Joseph Hoffman and Al Martin		
Caroline, or Change	2004	Broadway	Jeanine Tesori	Tony Kushner	Kushner		
Carousel + film (1956)	1945	Broadway	Richard Rodgers	Oscar Hammerstein II	Hammerstein II	Notable songs: "Soliloquy", "You'll Never Walk Alone" and "If I Loved You".	
Carrie	1988	Broadway	Michael Gore	Dean Pitchford	Lawrence D. Cohen		
Casbah	1948	Film	Harold Arlen	Leo Robin	Leslie Bush-Fekete		
The Casino Girl	1900	Broadway	Various artists	Various artists	Harry B. Smith		
Castles in the Air	1926	Broadway	Percy Wenrich	Raymond W. Peck	Peck		
The Cat and the Fiddle	1931	Broadway	Jerome Kern	Otto Harbach	Harbach		
Cat Kid Comic Club: The Musical	2023	Off-Broadway	Brad Alexander	Kevin Del Aguila	Kevin Del Aguila	Based on the Cat Kid Comic Club graphic novels by Dav Pilkey	
Catch Me If You Can	2009	Broadway	Marc Shaiman	Scott Wittman and Shaiman	Terrence McNally	Notable songs: "Live in Living Color", and "Jet Set".	
Catch My Soul	1970	West End	Ray Pohlman and Emil Dean Zoghby	Jack Good	William Shakespeare		
The Catch of the Season	1904	West End	Herbert Haines and Evelyn Baker	Charles H. Taylor	Seymour Hicks and Cosmo Hamilton		
A Catered Affair	2008	Broadway	John Bucchino		Harvey Fierstein		
Cats + films (1998) and (2019)	1981	West End	Andrew Lloyd Webber	T. S. Eliot	Trevor Nunn	Notable songs: "Memory", "Mr. Mistoffelees" and "Macavity: The Mystery Cat".	
Cats Don't Dance	1997	Animated film	Randy Newman	Newman	Roberts Gannaway, Cliff Ruby and Elana Lesser		
Celebration	1969	Broadway	Harvey Schmidt	Tom Jones	Jones		
Centennial Summer	1946	Film	Jerome Kern	Oscar Hammerstein II	Michael Kanin		
The Century Girl	1916	Broadway revue	Victor Herbert and Irving Berlin	Berlin and Henry Blossom	—N/a		
Champagne Charlie	1944	Film	Billy Mayerl	Lord Berners	John Dighton, Angus MacPhail and Austin Melford	Notable song: "Champagne Charlie".	
Chaplin	2006	Broadway	Christopher Curtis	Curtis	Curtis and Thomas Meehan		
Charlie and the Chocolate Factory	2013	West End	Marc Shaiman and Scott Wittman	Shaiman and Wittman	David Greig		
Charlie Girl	1965	West End	David Heneker and John Taylor	Heneker and Taylor	Hugh Williams, Margaret Vyner and Ray Cooney		
Charlotte Sweet	1982	Off-Broadway	Gerald Jay Markoe	Michael Colby	Colby		
Charlotte's Web	1973	Animated film	Robert B. Sherman and Richard M. Sherman	Sherman and Sherman	Earl Hamner, Jr.		
Chasing Rainbows	1930	Film	Milton Ager	Jack Yellen	Al Boasberg and Robert E. Hopkins	Notable song: "Happy Days Are Here Again".	
Chee-Chee	1928	Broadway	Richard Rodgers	Lorenz Hart	Lew M. Fields		
The Cheetah Girls	2003	Film	John Van Tongeren and Mark Mothersbaugh		—N/a	Notable songs: "Cinderella", "Girl Power" and "Cheetah Sisters".	
The Cheetah Girls 2	2006	Film			—N/a	Notable songs: "The Party's Just Begun", "Strut", "Step Up" and "Amigas Cheetahs".	
The Cheetah Girls: One World	2008	Film	David Nessim Lawrence		—N/a	Notable songs: "Cheetah Love" and "One World".	
The Cher Show	2018	Broadway jukebox	Cher	Cher	Rick Elice		
Chess	1986	West End	Benny Andersson and Björn Ulvaeus	Tim Rice and Ulvaeus	Richard Nelson	Notable songs: "One Night in Bangkok" and "I Know Him So Well".	
Chicago + film (2002)	1975	Broadway	John Kander	Fred Ebb	Ebb and Bob Fosse	Notable songs: "All That Jazz", "Cell Block Tango", "Mr. Cellophane" and "We Both Reached for the Gun".	
Chick Flick the Musical	2019	Off-Broadway	Suzy Conn	Conn	Conn		
Children of Eden	1991	West End	Stephen Schwartz	Schwartz	John Caird	Notable song: "The Spark of Creation".	
Children's Letters to God	2004	Off-Broadway	David Evans	Douglas J. Cohen	Stoo Hample		
Chin-Chin	1914	Broadway	Ivan Caryll	Anne Caldwell and James O'Dea	Caldwell and R. H. Burnside		
A Chinese Honeymoon	1899	West End	Howard Talbot and Ivan Caryll	Harry Greenbank	George Dance		
Chitty Chitty Bang Bang + film (1968)	2002	West End	Richard M. Sherman and Robert B. Sherman	Sherman and Sherman	Jeremy Sams	Based on the film of the same name.	
The Chocolate Dandies	1924	Broadway	Eubie Blake	Noble Sissle	Sissle and Lew Payton		
The Chocolate Soldier	1908	German	Oscar Straus	Stanislaus Stange	Rudolf Bernauer and Leopold Jacobson		
A Chorus Line + film (1985)	1975	Broadway	Marvin Hamlisch	Edward Kleban	James Kirkwood, Jr. and Nicholas Dante	Notable songs: "What I Did for Love" and "One".	
Chris and the Wonderful Lamp	1900	Broadway	John Philip Sousa	Glen MacDonough	MacDonough		
Christine	1960	Broadway	Sammy Fain	Paul Francis Webster	Pearl S. Buck and Charles K. Peck, Jr.		
A Christmas Carol + film (2004)	1995	Off-Broadway	Alan Menken	Lynn Ahrens	Mike Ockrent and Ahrens		
The Christmas Schooner	1995	Off-Off-Broadway	Julie Shannon	Shannon	John Reeger		
A Christmas Story	2012	Broadway	Benj Pasek and Justin Paul	Pasek and Paul	Joseph Robinette		
Chronicle of a Death Foretold	1995	Broadway	Bob Telson	Graciela Daniele, Jim Lewis and Michael John LaChiusa	Daniele, Lewis and LaChiusa		
Chu Chin Chow + film (1934)	1916	West End	Frederic Norton	Norton	Oscar Asche		
Church Basement Ladies	2005	Off-Off-Broadway	Drew Jansen	Jansen	Jim Stowell and Jessica Zuehlke		
Cinderella	1950	Animated film	Mack David, Al Hoffman and Jerry Livingston	David, Hoffman and Livingston	Various writers	Notable songs: "A Dream Is a Wish Your Heart Makes" and "Bibbidi-Bobbidi-Boo".	
Cinderella + film (1957) + film (1997)	2013	Broadway	Richard Rodgers	Oscar Hammerstein II	Hammerstein II and Douglas Carter Beane	Based on the original 1957 television special. Notable songs: "In My Own Little Corner" and "Ten Minutes Ago".	
Cindy	1964	Off-Broadway	Johnny Brandon	Brandon	Joe Sauter and Mike Sawyer		
Cindy: Cendrillon 2002	2002	French	Romano Musumarra	Musumarra	Luc Plamondon		
The Cingalee	1904	West End	Lionel Monckton and Paul Rubens	Adrian Ross and Percy Greenbank	James T. Tanner		
City of Angels	1989	Broadway	Cy Coleman	David Zippel	Larry Gelbart	Notable songs: "You're Nothing Without Me" and "Funny".	
The Civil War	1999	Broadway	Frank Wildhorn	Jack Murphy	Gregory Boyd and Wildhorn	Notable song: "Tell My Father".	
Clambake	1967	Film	Various artists	Various artists	Arthur Browne, Jr.		
A Class Act	2001	Broadway	Edward Kleban	Kleban	Linda Kline and Lonny Price		
Cleavage	1982	Broadway revue	Buddy Sheffield	Sheffield	Sheffield and David Sheffield		
Clinton	2012	Off-Broadway	Paul Hodge	Paul Hodge	Paul Hodge and Michael Hodge	A satiric musical based on the presidency of Bill Clinton.	
Close Harmony	1929	Film	Richard A. Whiting	Leo Robin	Elsie Janis and Gene Markey		
Closer Than Ever	1989	Off-Broadway revue	David Shire	Richard Maltby, Jr.	—N/a		
Closer to Heaven	2001	West End	Pet Shop Boys	Pet Shop Boys	Jonathan Harvey		
Clue	1997	Off-Broadway	Galen Blum, Wayne Barker and Vinnie Martucci	Tom Chiodo	Peter DePietro		
Clueless	2018	Off-Broadway	Various artists	Various artists	Amy Heckerling	Based on the 1995 film of the same name.	
The Co-Optimists + film (1929)	1921	West End revue	Various artists	Various artists	—N/a		
Coco	1969	Broadway	André Previn	Alan Jay Lerner	Lerner		
The Cocoanut Grove	1938	Film	John Leipold	Leo Shuken	Sy Bartlett and Olive Cooper		
The Cocoanuts + film (1929)	1925	Broadway	Irving Berlin		George S. Kaufman		
Colleen	1936	Film	Harry Warren	Al Dubin	Robert Lord		
College Humor	1933	Film	Arthur Johnston	Sam Coslow	Claude Binyon and Frank Butler		
Colma	2007	Film	H.P. Mendoza	Mendoza	Mendoza		
The Color Purple	2005	Broadway	Brenda Russell, Allee Willis and Stephen Bray	Russell, Willis and Bray	Marsha Norman	Notable song: "I'm Here".	
Come from Away	2017	Broadway	Irene Sankoff and David Hein	Sankoff and Hein	Sankoff and Hein		
Come Summer	1969	Broadway	David Baker	Will Holt	Holt		
Comin' Round the Mountain	1951	Film	Joseph Gershenson	Gershenson	Robert Lees and Frederic Riedel		
The Commitments	2013	West End Jukebox	Various Artists	Various Artists	Roddy Doyle	Based on the 1987 novel of the same name.	
Company	1970	Broadway	Stephen Sondheim		George Furth	Notable songs: "The Ladies Who Lunch", "(Not) Getting Married Today" and "Being Alive".	
Coney Island	1943	Film	Ralph Rainger	Leo Robin	George Seaton		
A Connecticut Yankee	1927	Broadway	Richard Rodgers	Lorenz Hart	Herbert Fields	Notable song: "Thou Swell".	
A Connecticut Yankee in King Arthur's Court	1949	Film	Jimmy Van Heusen	Johnny Burke	Edmund Beloin		
The Conquering Hero	1961	Broadway	Moose Charlap	Norman Gimbel	Larry Gelbart		
Contact	2000	Broadway	Various artists	Various artists	John Weidman		
Conversation Piece	1934	West End	Noël Coward	Coward	Coward		
Copacabana	1947	Film	Edward Ward	Ward	László Vadnay, Allen Boretz and Howard Harris		
Copacabana	1994	West End revue	Barry Manilow	Manilow	Manilo		
Copper and Brass	1957	Broadway	David Baker	David Craig	Ellen Violett and Craig		
Coraline	2009	Off-Broadway	Stephin Merritt	Merritt	David Greenspan	Based on Neil Gaiman's novella of the same name	
Corpse Bride	2005	Film	Danny Elfman	John August	August, Caroline Thompson and Pamela Pettler		
Cotton Patch Gospel	1981	Off-Broadway	Harry Chapin	Chapin	Tom Key and Russell Treyz		
The Count of Luxembourg	1911	West End	Franz Lehár	Basil Hood and Adrian Ross	Hood and Ross		
The Count of Monte Cristo	2009	German	Jack Murphy	Frank Wildhorn	Murphy	Twelve select songs are sung in English; contains influences from the 2002 film adaptation of the book.	
The Count of Monte Cristo	2016	Broadway	Jack Murphy	Frank Wildhorn	Murphy	American premiere; directed by Marcia Milgrom Dodge.	
Countess Maritza	1924	German	Emmerich Kálmán	Harry B. Smith	Julius Brammer and Alfred Grünwald		
The Court Jester	1956	Film	Sylvia Fine	Sammy Cahn	Melvin Frank and Norman Panama		
Cover Girl	1944	Film	Jerome Kern	Ira Gershwin and E. Y. Harburg	Virginia Van Upp		
Cowardy Custard	1972	West End revue	Noël Coward	Coward	Coward		
Cowboy from Brooklyn	1938	Film	Leo F. Forbstein	Adolph Deutsch	Robert Sloane and Louis Pelletier		
Coyote Tales	1998	Off-Broadway	Henry Mollicone	Sheldon Harnick	Harnick		
The Cradle Will Rock	1938	Broadway	Marc Blitzstein	Blitzstein	Blitzstein		
Cranks	1956	Broadway revue	John Addison	John Cranko	—N/a		
Crazy for You	1992	Broadway	George Gershwin	Ira Gershwin	Ken Ludwig	A revised version of Girl Crazy	
Crossroads	1986	Film	Ry Cooder	Cooder	John Fusco		
Cruel Intentions	2015	Off-Broadway	Various	Various	Roger Kumble, Jordan Ross, and Lindsey Rosin	Based on the 1999 film.	
Cry-Baby + film (1990)	2007	Broadway	Adam Schlesinger	David Javerbaum	Mark O'Donnell and Thomas Meehan	Based on the 1990 film of the same name.	
Cry for Us All	1970	Broadway	Mitch Leigh	William Alfred and Phyllis Robinson	Alfred and Albert Marre		
Cuban Love Song	1931	Film	Herbert Stothart	Stothart	C. Gardner Sullivan and Bess Meredyth		
The Cuckoos	1930	Film	Harry Ruby	Ruby	Guy Bolton and Bert Kalmar		
The Curious Case of Benjamin Button	2019	Off-West End	Darren Clark	Darren Clark and Jethro Compton	Jethro Compton	Based on the 1922 short story of the same name	
Curley McDimple	1967	Off-Broadway	Robert Dahdah	Dahdah	Dahdah and Mary Boylan		
Curtains	2007	Broadway	John Kander	Fred Ebb	Rupert Holmes		
Cyrano	1973	Broadway	Michael J. Lewis	Anthony Burgess	Burgess	Based on Anthony Burgess's translation of the Edmond Rostand play Cyrano de Bergerac.	
Cyrano	1993	Broadway	Ad van Dijk	Koen van Dijk, Peter Reeves and Sheldon Harnick	van Dijk		

== D ==
D
Production	Year	Venue/type	Music	Lyrics	Book	Notes	Reference
Daddy Cool	2006	West End	Boney M., Frank Farian	Boney M., Frank Farian			
Daddy Long Legs	1955	Film	Johnny Mercer	Johnny Mercer	Phoebe Ephron, Henry Ephron		
Daddy Long Legs	2009	Off-Broadway	Paul Gordon	Paul Gordon	John Caird		
Dames	1934	Film	Harry Warren, Sammy Fain, Allie Wrubel	Al Dubin, Irving Kahal, Mort Dixon	Robert Lord, Delmer Daves		
Dames at Sea	1966	Off-Off-Broadway	Jim Wise	George Haimsohn, Robin Miller	George Haimsohn, Robin Miller		
Damn Yankees	1955	Broadway	Richard Adler	Jerry Ross	George Abbott, Douglass Wallop	Based on the novel The Year the Yankees Lost the Pennant by Douglass Wallop. Notable songs: "Heart", "Whatever Lola Wants."	
A Damsel in Distress	1937	Film	George Gershwin	Ira Gershwin	P. G. Wodehouse	Based on the novel of the same name by P. G. Wodehouse. Notable song: "A Foggy Day".	
Dance a Little Closer	1983	Broadway	Charles Strouse	Alan Jay Lerner	Alan Jay Lerner	Based on the play Idiot's Delight by Robert E. Sherwood.	
The Dance of Life	1929	Film	Richard A. Whiting	Sam Coslow and Leo Robin	Benjamin Glazer		
Dance of the Vampires	1997	Vienna	Jim Steinman	Michael Kunze	Michael Kunze	Based on the film The Fearless Vampire Killers by Roman Polanski.	
Dance with Me	1975	Broadway	Greg Antonacci	Greg Antonacci	Greg Antonacci		
Dancer in the Dark	2000	Film	Björk	Björk, Lars von Trier, Sjón	Lars von Trier		
Dancin'	1978	Broadway	various	various	Bob Fosse		
Dancing Lady	1933	Film	Louis Silvers and Burton Lane	Harold Adamson	Allen Rivkin and P. J. Wolfson		
The Dancing Years	1939	West End	Ivor Novello	Christopher Hassall	Ivor Novello		
Dangerous Games	1989	Broadway	Willian Finn	Astor Piazzolla			
A Dangerous Maid	1923	Broadway	George Gershwin	Ira Gershwin	Charles W. Bell	Based on Bell's 1918 play, A Dislocated Honeymoon.	
Dangerous When Wet	1953	Film	Albert Sendrey and Georgie Stoll		Dorothy Kingsley		
Darby O'Gill and the Little People	1959	Film	Oliver Wallace	Lawrence Edward Watkin	Lawrence Edward Watkin	Based on books Darby O'Gill and the Good People and The Ashes of Old Wishes And Other Darby O'Gill Tales by Herminie Templeton Kavanagh	
Darling Lili	1970	Film	Henry Mancini	Johnny Mercer	William Peter Blatty and Blake Edwards		
Darling of the Day	1968	Broadway	Jule Styne	Yip Harburg	Nunnally Johnson	Based on the novel Buried Alive by Arnold Bennett.	
A Date with Judy	1948	Film	Ernesto Lecuona		Dorothy Kingsley	Based on the radio series of the same name.	
A Day at the Races	1937	Film	Bronisław Kaper and Walter Jurmann	Gus Kahn	Robert Pirosh, George Seaton, and George Oppenheimer		
The Day Before Spring	1945	Broadway	Frederick Loewe	Alan Jay Lerner	Alan Jay Lerner		
A Day in Hollywood / A Night in the Ukraine	1979	West End	Frank Lazarus and others	Dick Vosburgh	Dick Vosburgh	Second act based on the one-act play The Bear by Anton Chekhov.	
Days of Wine and Roses	2023	Broadway	Adam Guettel	Guettel	Craig Lucas	Based on the 1962 film of the same name and the 1958 teleplay of the same name.	
De-Lovely	2004	Film	Cole Porter	Cole Porter	Jay Cocks		
Dead Outlaw	2024	Broadway	David Yazbeck and Erik Della Penna	Yazbeck and Della Penna	Itamar Moses	Based on the life of Elmer McCurdy.	
Dear Edwina	2008	Off-Broadway	Zina Goldrich	Marcy Heisler	Marcy Heisler		
Dear Evan Hansen	2016	Broadway	Pasek and Paul	Pasek and Paul	Steven Levenson	Winner of 2017 Tony Award for Best Musical	
Dear World	1969	Broadway	Jerry Herman	Jerry Herman	Jerome Lawrence and Robert E. Lee	Based on the play The Madwoman of Chaillot by Jean Giraudoux.	
Dearest Enemy	1925	Broadway	Richard Rodgers	Lorenz Hart	Herbert Fields		
Death Becomes Her	2024	Broadway	Julia Mattison, Noel Carey	Julia Mattison, Noel Carey	Marco Pennette	Based on the 1992 film of the same name by Robert Zemeckis	
Death Note	2015	Seoul, South Korea	Frank Wildhorn	Lorenz Hart	Ivan Menchell	Based on Death Note by Tsugumi Ohba and Takeshi Obata	
Death of a Salesman	1949	Broadway	Alex North	Alex North	Arthur Miller		
Death Takes a Holiday	2011	Off-Broadway	Maury Yeston	Yeston	Peter Stone and Thomas Meehan	Based on La Morte in Vacanza by Alberto Casella	
The Deb + film (2024)	2022	Australian	Megan Washington	Megan Washington and Hannah Reilly	Hannah Reilly		
Debbie Does Dallas	2002	Off-Broadway	Andrew Sherman, Tom Kitt, Jonathan Callicutt	Andrew Sherman, Tom Kitt, Jonathan Callicutt	Susan L. Schwartz		
Deep in My Heart	1954	Film	Sigmund Romberg	Oscar Hammerstein II, Otto Harbach, Dorothy Donnelly, Roger Edens, Cyrus D. Wood, Ballard MacDonald, Rida Johnson Young, Harold Atteridge, Herbert Reynolds	Leonard Spigelgass, Elliott Arnold		
Delicious	1931	Film	George Gershwin	Ira Gershwin	Guy Boltons, Sonya Levien		
Delightfully Dangerous	1945	Film	Morton Gould	Edward Heyman	Walter DeLeon, Arthur Phillips		
Les Demoiselles de Rochefort	1967	Film	Michel Legrand	Jacques Demy	Jacques Demy		
Descendants	2015	Film	David Lawrence	David Lawrence	Josann McGibbon and Sara Parriott	Disney Channel Original Movie	
Descendants 2	2017	Film	David Lawrence	David Lawrence	Josann McGibbon and Sara Parriott	Disney Channel Original Movie	
Descendants 3	2019	Film	David Lawrence	David Lawrence	Josann McGibbon and Sara Parriott	Disney Channel Original Movie	
The Desert Song + film (1929)	1926	Broadway	Sigmund Romberg	Otto Harbach	Oscar Hammerstein II, Otto Harbach, and Frank Mandel		
Dessa Rose	2005	Off-Broadway	Stephen Flaherty	Lynn Ahrens	Lynn Ahrens	Based on the novel of the same name by Sherley Anne Williams.	
Destry Rides Again	1939	Film	Friedrich Hollaender	Frank Loesser	Felix Jackson	Based on the novel of the same name by Max Brand.	
Destry Rides Again	1959	Broadway	Harold Rome	Harold Rome	Leonard Gershe	Based on the novel of the same name by George Marshall.	
Devil-May-Care	1929	Film	Herbert Stothart	Clifford Grey	Richard Schayer		
The Devil Wears Prada	2022	Chicago	Elton John	Shaina Taub	Kate Wetherhead	Based on the novel and film of the same name	
Diamonds	1984	Off-Broadway	Gerard Alessandrini, Craig Carnelia, Cy Coleman, Larry Grossman, John Kander, Doug Katsaros, Alan Menken, Jonathan Sheffer, Lynn Udall, Albert Von Tilzer, Jim Wann	Gerard Alessandrini, Howard Ashman, Craig Carnelia, Betty Comden, Fred Ebb, Ellen Fitzhugh, Adolph Green, Karl Kennett, Jack Norworth, Jim Wann, David Zippel	Bud Abbott, Ralph G. Allen, Roy Blount, Jr., Richard Camp, Jerry L. Crawford, Lou Costello, Lee Eisenberg, Jim Wann, John Lahr, Arthur Masella, Harry Stein, John Weidman, Alan Zweibel		
Diana	2019	Broadway	David Bryan	David Bryan and Joe DiPietro	Joe DiPietro	Based on the life of Diana, Princess of Wales	
Dick Tracy	1990	Film	Madonna, Patrick Leonard, Stephen Sondheim, Michael Kernan, Andy Paley, Jeff Lass, Ned Claflin, Jonathan Paley, Shep Pettibone, Danny Elfman	Madonna, Stephen Sondheim, Andy Paley	Jim Cash, Jack Epps, Jr.	Based on the comic strip of the same name by Chester Gould.	
Different Times	1972	Broadway	Michael Brown	Michael Brown	Michael Brown		
Dimples	1936	Film	Jimmy McHugh	Ted Koehler	Nat Perrinn and Arthur Sheekman		
Diner	2014	Regional	Sheryl Crow	Crow	Barry Levinson	Based on the 1982 film of the same name.	
Dirty Rotten Scoundrels	2004	Broadway	David Yazbek	David Yazbek	Jeffrey Lane	Based on the film of the same name by Frank Oz.	
Disaster!	2016	Broadway	Various Artists	Various Artists	Jack Plotnick and Seth Rudetsky		
Disco Inferno	2004	West End	various	various			
The District Leader	1906	Broadway	Joseph E. Howard	Joseph E. Howard	Joseph E. Howard		
Divorce Me, Darling!	1965	West End	Sandy Wilson	Sandy Wilson	Sandy Wilson	Sequel to the musical The Boy Friend by Sandy Wilson.	
Les Dix Commandements	2000	French	Pascal Obispo	Lionel Florence and Patrice Guirao	Élie Chouraqui and Pascal Obispo		
Dixiana	1930	Film	Max Steiner		Luther Reed		
Dixie	1943	Film	Jimmy Van Heusen	Johnny Burke	Karl Tunberg, Darrell Ware, Claude Binyon		
Do Black Patent Leather Shoes Really Reflect Up?	1979	Broadway	James Quinn and Alaric Jans	James Quinn and Alaric Jans	John R. Powers		
Do I Hear a Waltz?	1965	Broadway	Richard Rodgers	Stephen Sondheim	Arthur Laurents	Based on the play The Time of the Cuckoo by Arthur Laurents.	
Do Re Mi	1960	Broadway	Jule Styne	Betty Comden and Adolph Green	Garson Kanin		
Doctor Dolittle + film (1967)	1998	Touring	Leslie Bricusse	Bricusse	Bricusse	Based on the 1967 film and the children's books by Hugh Lofting. Notable song: "Talk to the Animals".	
Doctor Zhivago	2011	Sydney	Lucy Simon	Michael Korie and Amy Powers	Michael Weller	Based on the novel of the same name by Boris Pasternak.	
Dog Man	2019	Off-Broadway	Brad Alexander	Kevin Del Aguila		Based on the Dog Man series by Dav Pilkey.	
Dogfight	2012	Off-Broadway	Pasek and Paul	Pasek and Paul	Peter Duchan	Based on the film of the same name by Nancy Savoca.	
Doll	2003	Workshop production	Scott Frankel	Michael Korie	Michael Korie		
Doll Face	1945	Film	Jimmy McHugh, Lionel Newman (The Parisian Trot)	Harold Adamson, Charles E. Henderson (The Parisian Trot)	Harold Buchman	Based on the play The Naked Genius by Gypsy Rose Lee.	
Die Dollarprinzessin	1907	Operetta	Leo Fall	Alfred Maria Willner and Fritz Grünbaum	Alfred Maria Willner and Fritz Grünbaum		
A Doll's Life	1982	Broadway	Larry Grossman	Betty Comden and Adolph Green	Betty Comden and Adolph Green	Based on the play A Doll's House by Henrik Ibsen.	
Dolly: A True Original Musical	2027	Broadway	Dolly Parton	Dolly Parton	Dolly Parton, Maria S. Schlatter	A stage biomusical based on the life and early career of country music legend Dolly Parton	
The Dolly Sisters	1945	Film	Various	Various	John Larkin and Marian Spitzer		
Donnybrook!	1961	Broadway	Johnny Burke	Johnny Burke	Robert E. McEnroe	Based on the film The Quiet Man by John Ford.	
Don't Bother Me, I Can't Cope	1971	Broadway	Micki Grant	Micki Grant			
Don't Play Us Cheap	1972	Broadway	Melvin Van Peebles	Melvin Van Peebles	Melvin Van Peebles		
Doonesbury	1983	Broadway	Elizabeth Swados	Garry Trudeau	Garry Trudeau	Based on the comic strip of the same name by Garry Trudeau.	
Double or Nothing	1937	Film	Burton Lane, Arthur Johnston, Johnny Burke, John Leipold, Victor Young, Al Siegel, Sam Coslow, Sanford Green	Burton Lane, Ralph Freed, Johnny Burke, Irving Kahal	Duke Atteberry, Erwin Gelsey, John Moffitt, Charles Lederer		
Double Trouble	1967	Film	Various Artists	Various Artists	Jo Heims	Stars Elvis Presley	
Down Argentine Way	1940	Film	Harry Warren and Jimmy McHugh	Mack Gordon and Al Dubin	Rian James, Ralph Spence, Karl Tunberg, Karl Tunberg, Darrell Ware		
Down to Earth	1947	Film	George Duning and Heinz Eric Roemheld		Harry Segall, Edwin Blum	Sequel to the film Here Comes Mr. Jordan by Alexander Hall.	
Dr. Horrible's Sing-Along Blog	2008	Web miniseries	Joss Whedon, Maurissa Tancharoen, Jed Whedon	Joss Whedon, Maurissa Tancharoen, Jed Whedon	Joss Whedon, Zack Whedon, Maurissa Tancharoen, Jed Whedon		
Dr. Seuss' How the Grinch Stole Christmas!	1994	Broadway	Mel Marvin and Albert Hague	Timothy Mason and Dr. Seuss	Timothy Mason	Based on the children's story of the same name by Dr. Seuss.	
Dracula	2001	Broadway	Frank Wildhorn	Don Black and Christopher Hampton	Black and Hampton	Based on the novel of the same name by Bram Stoker.	
Dracula – Entre l'amour et la mort	2006	Quebec	Simon Leclerc	Roger Tabra	Bruno Pelletier and Richard Ouzounian		
Drat! The Cat!	1965	Broadway	Milton Schafer	Ira Levin	Levin	Notable song: "She Touched Me".	
Dream House	1932	Film					
Dream True	2004		Ricky Ian Gordon	Ricky Ian Gordon	Ricky Ian Gordon		
Dreamboats and Petticoats	2009	West End	Various	Various	Laurence Marks and Maurice Gran	Based on the compilation album of the same name.	
Dreamgirls + film (2006)	1981	Broadway	Henry Krieger	Tom Eyen	Tom Eyen	Semi-based on The Supremes. Notable song: "And I Am Telling You I'm Not Going".	
Dreams Come True	1936	Film	Franz Lehár, Colin Wark, Ben Frankel	Bruce Sevier	Donald Bull		
Die Drei von der Tankstelle	1930	Film	Werner R. Heymann		Franz Schulz and Paul Frank		
The Drifters Girl	2021	West End	Various	Various	Ed Curtis and Tina Treadwell (idea)		
The Drowsy Chaperone	2006	Broadway	Lisa Lambert and Greg Morrison	Lisa Lambert and Greg Morrison	Bob Martin and Don McKellar		
DuBarry Was a Lady	1939	Broadway	Cole Porter	Cole Porter	Herbert Fields and Buddy DeSylva	Notable song: "Friendship."	
The Duchess of Dantzic	1903	London comic opera	Ivan Caryll	Henry Hamilton	Henry Hamilton	Based on the play Madame Sans-Gêne by Victorien Sardou and Émile Moreau.	
Duchess of Idaho	1950	Film	Al Rinker, Floyd Huddleston, Henry Nemo, Lee Pearl	Al Rinker, Floyd Huddleston, Henry Nemo, Lee Pearl	Dorothy Cooper, Jerry Davis, Sid Fields		
Duck Soup	1933	Film	Harry Ruby	Bert Kalmar	Harry Ruby, Bert Kalmar, Arthur Sheekman, Nat Perrin		
Dude	1972	Broadway	Galt MacDermot	Gerome Ragni	Gerome Ragni		
Duffy's Tavern	1945	Film	Robert E. Dolan		Melvin Frank and Norman Panama	Based on the radio series of the same name created by Ed Gardner.	
Dumbo	1941	Film	Frank Churchill and Oliver Wallace	Frank Churchill and Oliver Wallace	Otto Englander, Joe Grant, Dick Huemer	Based on the children story the same name. Notable song: "Baby Mine".	
Dusty – The Original Pop Diva	2005	Australian Jukebox	various	various	John-Michael Howson, David Mitchell, Melvyn Morrow	Based on songs by Dusty Springfield.	

== E ==
E
Production	Year	Venue/type	Music	Lyrics	Book	Notes
Eadie Was a Lady	1945	Film	George Duning	Marlin Skiles	Monte Brice	Based on the musical Take a Chance.
The Earl and the Girl	1903	West End	Ivan Caryll	Percy Greenbank	Seymour Hicks	
Earl Carroll Vanities of 1931	1931	Broadway	Burton Lane	Harold Adamson	Ralph Spence and Eddie Welch	
Earl of Ruston	1971	Broadway	Peter Link	C.C. Courtney and Ragan Courtney	Courtney and Courtney	
Early to Bed	1943	Broadway	Fats Waller	George Marion, Jr.	Marion, Jr.	
Earth Girls Are Easy	1988	Film	Ray Colcord and Nile Rodgers	Julie Brown	Brown, Charlie Coffey and Terrence E. McNally	
The East Side of Heaven	1939	Film	Frank Skinner	Skinner	William Conselman and James V. Kern	
Easter Parade	1948	Film	Johnny Green, Roger Edens and Irving Berlin	Berlin	Sidney Sheldon, Frances Goodrich and Albert Hackett	
Easter Rising	2004	Off-Broadway	Michael Arden	Arden	Isaac Oliver	
Easy to Love	1953	Film	Georgie Stoll	Robert Van Eps	László Vadnay and William Roberts	
Eating Raoul	1992	Off-Broadway	Jed Feuer	Boyd Graham	Paul Bartel and Richard Blackburn	Based on the movie of the same name.
Ed Wynn Carnival	1920	Broadway revue	Ed Wynn	Wynn	Wynn	
The Eddie Cantor Story	1954	Film	David Buttolph	Buttolph	Ted Sherdeman, Sidney Skolsky and Jerome Weidman	
The Eddy Duchin Story	1956	Film	George Duning	Duning	Samuel A. Taylor	
The Education of H*Y*M*A*N K*A*P*L*A*N	1968	Broadway	Oscar Brand and Paul Nassau	Brand and Nassau	Benjamin Bernard Zavin	
Eight Crazy Nights	2002	Film	Teddy Castellucci, Marc Ellis, and Ray Ellis	Teddy Castellucci, Marc Ellis, and Ray Ellis	Brooks Arthur, Allen Covert, Brad Isaacs, and Adam Sandler	
Eileen	1917	Broadway	Victor Herbert	Henry Blossom	Blossom	
Einbrecher	1930	Film	Friedrich Hollaender and Franz Waxman	Hollaender and Waxman	Robert Liebmann	
Elegies	2003	Off-Broadway revue	William Finn	Finn	Finn	
Elegies for Angels, Punks and Raging Queens	1993	Off-Broadway	Janet Hood	Bill Russell	Russell	
Elf	2010	Broadway	Matthew Sklar	Chad Beguelin	Bob Martin and Thomas Meehan	Based on the 2003 Christmas film of the same name.
Elisabeth	1992	Austrian	Sylvester Levay	Michael Kunze	Kunze	Based on the life of Empress Elisabeth of Austria.
Elixier	1997	German	Tobias Künzel and Wolfgang Lenk	Kati Naumann	Horst Königstein	
Ella Enchanted	2017	Regional	Deborah Wicks La Puma	Wicks La Puma	Karen Zacarias	Based on the 1997 book of the same name and the 2004 film of the same name.
Elsie	1923	Broadway	George Gershwin	Ira Gershwin	Charles W. Bell	Originally entitled A Dangerous Maid.
Emir	2010	Film	Chino Toledo, Vin Dancel and Ebe Dancel	Diwa de Leon and Gary Granada	Jerry Gracio	
Emmet Otter's Jug-Band Christmas	1977	Film	Paul Williams		Lillian Hoban, Russell Hoban, Jerry Juhl	Jim Henson
Emo the Musical	2016	Film	Neil Triffett, Charlotte Nicdao, Craig Pilkington		Neil Triffett	
The Emperor Waltz	1948	Film	Victor Young	Young	Billy Wilder and Charles Brackett	
The Emu War	2024	Musical theatre	Lotte Pearl	Lotte Pearl	Lotte Pearl	PearlWhirl Productions
Enchanted	2007	Film	Alan Menken	Stephen Schwartz	Bill Kelly	Disney film starring Amy Adams, Patrick Dempsey and James Marsden.
The Enchantress	1911	Broadway	Victor Herbert	Fred de Gresac and Harry B. Smith	de Gresac and Smith	
End of the Rainbow	2005	West End	Various	Various	Peter Quilter	
Erminie	1885	Off-West End	Edward Jakobowski	Claxson Bellamy and Harry Paulton	—N/a	
Ernest in Love	1960	Off-Broadway	Lee Pockriss	Anne Croswell	Croswell	
Escape to Margaritaville	2017	Broadway	Jimmy Buffett	Buffett	Greg Garcia and Mike O'Malley	Features numerous Jimmy Buffett songs.
Eubie!	1978	Broadway revue	Eubie Blake	Noble Sissle, Andy Razaf, Johnny Brandon, F. E. Miller and Jim Europe	—N/a	
Eugenius!	2016	Off-West End	Ben Adams and Chris Wilkins	Ben Adams and Chris Wilkins	Ben Adams and Chris Wilkins	
Evangeline, or The Belle of Acadia	1874	Broadway	Edward E. Rice	J. Cheever Goodwin	Goodwin	
Evening Primrose	1966	Television	Stephen Sondheim		James Goldman	
An Evening with Beatrice Lillie	1952	Broadway revue	Various	Various	—N/a	
Ever After	2015	Regional	Zina Goldrich	Marcy Heisler	Heisler	Based on the 1998 film of the same name.
Ever Green	1930	West End	Richard Rodgers	Lorenz Hart	Benn Levy	
Every Night at Eight	1935	Film	Frederick Hollander and Paul Mertz	Clifford Vaughan	C. Graham Barker and Stanley Garvey	
Everybody Sing	1938	Film	William Axt	Axt	Florence Ryerson, Edgar Allan Woolf and James Gruen	
Everybody's Talking About Jamie + film (2021)	2017	West End	Dan Gillespie Sells	Tom MacRae	Tom MacRae	
Everybody's Welcome	1931	Broadway	Sammy Fain	Irving Kahal	Lambert Carroll	
Everyday Rapture	2009	Broadway	Various	Various	Sherie Rene Scott and Dick Scanlan	
Everyone Says I Love You	1996	Film	Dick Hyman	Hyman	Woody Allen	
Everything I Have is Yours	1952	Film	David Rose	Rose	Ruth Brooks Flippen and George Wells	
Everything Is Rhythm	1936	Film	—N/a	—N/a	Jack Byrd and Syd Courtenay	
Evie and the Birdman	2001	Australian	John Field	Field	Field	
Evil Dead	2003	Canadian	Christopher Bond, Frank Cipolla, Melissa Morris and George Reinblatt	Reinblatt	Reinblatt	
Evita + film (1996)	1978	West End	Andrew Lloyd Webber	Tim Rice	Lloyd Webber and Rice	Based on Eva Perón. Notable songs: "Don't Cry for Me, Argentina" and "Another Suitcase in Another Hall". An additional song, "You Must Love Me", was added to the film.

== F ==
F
Production	Year	Venue/type	Music	Lyrics	Book	Notes
Face the Music	1932	Broadway	Irving Berlin		Moss Hart	
Fade Out - Fade In	1964	Broadway	Jule Styne	Betty Comden and Adolph Green	Comden and Green	Closed after 274 performances, after several changes in lead
Falsettoland	1990	Off-Broadway	William Finn	Finn	James Lapine	Later become half of Falsettos.
Falsettos	1992	Broadway	William Finn	Finn	James Lapine and Finn	
Fame + film (1980) + film (2009)	1988	Off-Broadway	Steve Margoshes	Jacques Levy	Jose Fernandez	Based on the 1980 film version.
A Family Affair	1962	Broadway	John Kander	James Goldman and William Goldman	Goldman and Goldman	
Fancy Nancy	2012	Off-Broadway	Danny Abosch	Susan DiLallo and Abosch	DiLallo	
FANGIRLS	2019	Australian Tour	Yve Blake	Yve Blake	Yve Blake	FANGIRLS performed an Australian tour in Brisbane, Sydney, Adelaide, Wollongong, Canberra, and Melbourne theatres.
Fanny	1954	Broadway	Harold Rome	Rome	S. N. Behrman and Joshua Logan	
The Fantasticks	1960	Off-Broadway	Harvey Schmidt	Tom Jones	Jones	Notable songs: "Try to Remember" and "Soon It's Gonna Rain".
Fellowship!	2004	Off-Broadway	Allen Simpson	Various	Kelly Holden-Bashar and Joel McCrary	A Tolkien parody.
F.F.F	1920	Australia	Reginald Stoneham	C. J. De Garis	C. J. De Garis	tour of major Australian cities
Fiddler on the Roof	1964	Broadway	Jerry Bock	Sheldon Harnick	Joseph Stein	Notable songs: "Tradition", "If I Were a Rich Man" and "Matchmaker, Matchmaker".
The Fields of Ambrosia	1996	Canadian	Martin Silvestri	Joel Higgins	Higgins	Based on the 1970 film The Traveling Executioner.
Finding Nemo	2007	Disney musical	Robert Lopez	Kristen Anderson-Lopez	Peter Brosius	
Finding Neverland	2012	Broadway	Scott Frankel and Michael Korie	Frankel and Korie	James Graham	Based on the 1998 play The Man Who Was Peter Pan by Allan Knee and the play's 2004 film adaptation by David Magee.
Fine and Dandy	1930	Broadway	Kay Swift	James Warburg	Donald Ogden Stewart	Notable song: "Fine and Dandy".
Fings Ain't Wot They Used T'Be	1959	West End	Lionel Bart		Frank Norman	
Finian's Rainbow	1947	Broadway	Burton Lane	E. Y. Harburg	Harburg and Fred Saidy	Notable songs: "How are Things in Glocca Morra?" and "Old Devil Moon".
Fiorello!	1959	Broadway	Jerry Bock	Sheldon Harnick	Jerome Weidman and George Abbott	Notable song: "Little Tin Box".
Firebringer	2016	Chicago	Meredith Stepien and Mark Swiderski	Stepien and Swiderski	Matt Lang, Nick Lang, and Brian Holden	
First Date	2013	Broadway	Alan Zachary and Michael Weiner	Zachary and Weiner	Austin Winsberg	
First Impressions	1959	Broadway	George Weiss, Robert Goldman and Glenn Paxton	Weiss, Goldman and Paxton	Abe Burrows	Based on Jane Austen's novel Pride and Prejudice.
First Lady Suite	1993	Off-Broadway	Michael John LaChiusa			
The First Queen	2010	Seoul				
Five: The Parody Musical	2024	Off-Broadway	Billy Recce	Billy Recce, Moshiel Newman Daphne, Shimmy Braun	Daphne and Braun	
Five Guys Named Moe	1990	West End	Louis Jordan		Clarke Peters	
The Five O'Clock Girl	1928	Broadway	Harry Ruby	Bert Kalmar	Guy Bolton and Fred Thompson	
The Fix	1997	West End	Dana P. Rowe	John Dempsey	John Dempsey	
Flahooley	1951	Broadway	Sammy Fain	E.Y. Harburg	Harburg and Fred Saidy	
Flashdance	2008	West End	Robbie Roth	Roth and Robert Cary	Tom Hedley and Cary	Based on the film Flashdance
Flat Earthers	2024	Australian	Lou Wall and James Gales	Jean Tong and Lou Wall		
Flora the Red Menace	1965	Broadway	John Kander	Fred Ebb	George Abbott and Robert W. Russell	Noted for Broadway debut of Liza Minnelli.
Florodora	1899	West End	Leslie Stuart and Paul Rubens	Rubens and Edward Boyd-Jones	Owen Hall	
Flower Drum Song + film (1961)	1958	Broadway	Richard Rodgers	Oscar Hammerstein II	Hammerstein II and Joseph Fields	Notable songs: "I Enjoy Being a Girl" and "Love, Look Away".
Floyd Collins	1996	Off-Broadway	Adam Guettel	Guettel and Tina Landau	Landau	
Fly by Night (musical)	2014	Off-Broadway	Will Connolly, Michael Mitnick, and Kim Rosenstock	Will Connolly, Michael Mitnick, and Kim Rosenstock	Will Connolly, Michael Mitnick, and Kim Rosenstock	
Flying High	1930	Broadway	Ray Henderson	B. G. DeSylva and Lew Brown	Brown, DeSylva, and John McGowan	
Flying Over Sunset	2021	Broadway	Tom Kitt	Michael Korie	James Lapine	
Follies	1971	Broadway	Stephen Sondheim		James Goldman	Notable songs: "Broadway Baby", "I'm Still Here" and "Losing My Mind".
Follow That Girl	1960	West End	Julian Slade and Dorothy Reynolds	Slade and Reynolds	Slade and Reynolds	
Follow the Boys	1963	Film	Various	Various	Lou Breslow and Gertrude Purcell	
Follow the Girls	1944	Broadway	Phil Charig, Dan Shapiro and Milton Pascal	Charig, Shapiro and Pascal	Guy Bolton and Fred Thompson	
Follow Thru	1929	Broadway	Ray Henderson	B. G. DeSylva and Lew Brown	DeSylva and Lawrence Schwab	
Footloose + film (1984) + film (2011)	1998	Broadway	Tom Snow	Dean Pitchford	Pitchford and Walter Bobbie	Based on the 1984 film version.
Forbidden Broadway	1982	Off-Broadway revue	Various	Gerard Alessandrini	Alessandrini	
Forbidden Zone	1980	Film	Danny Elfman	Elfman	Richard Elfman	
Forever Plaid	1990	Off-Broadway	Various	Various	Stuart Ross	
The Fortress of Solitude	2014	Off-Broadway	Michael Friedman	Friedman	Itamar Moses	Based on Jonathan Lethem's novel of the same name.
Fosse	1999	Broadway revue	Various	Various	—N/a	
The Four Musketeers	1967	West End	Laurie Johnson	Herbert Kretzmera	Michael Pertwee	
Foxy	1964	Broadway	Robert Emmett Dolan	Johnny Mercer	Ian McLellan Hunter and Ring Lardner, Jr.	Based on Ben Jonson's play Volpone.
Frankenstein	2007	Off-Broadway	Mark Baron	Jefferey Jackson	Jackson and Gary P Cohen	
Freaky Friday + film (2018)	2016	Regional	Tom Kitt	Brian Yorkey	Bridget Carpenter	Based on the 1972 book of the same name, the musical is an adaptation of the 1976, 1995, and 2003 films.
Free as Air	1957	West End	Julian Slade	Dorothy Reynolds and Slade	Reynolds and Slade	
Freestyle Love Supreme	2019	Off-Broadway	Various	Various	Various	An 80-minute improvisational hip-hop musical based on audience suggestions. Concept created by Lin-Manuel Miranda, Thomas Kail, and Anthony Veneziale.
Friends! The Musical Parody	2017	Off-Broadway	Assaf Gleizner	Gleizner	Bob and Tobly McSmith	A musical parody of the television show Friends.
The Frogs	2004	Broadway	Stephen Sondheim		Burt Shevelove and Nathan Lane	Originally performed in Yale University's gymnasium's swimming pool in 1974.
From Here to Eternity	2013	West End	Stuart Brayson	Tim Rice	Bill Oakes	
From Justin to Kelly	2003	Film	Greg Siff	Michael Wandmacher	Kim Fuller	
Frozen + film (2013)	2017	Broadway	Robert Lopez and Kristen Anderson-Lopez	Lopez and Anderson-Lopez	Jennifer Lee	Based on the 2013 film of the same name.
Frozen Fever	2015	Short film	Christophe Beck	Beck	Chris Buck, Jennifer Lee, and Marc E. Smith	
Full House! The Musical!	2015	Off-Broadway	Bob and Tobly McSmith	Bob and Tobly McSmith	Bob and Tobly McSmith	A musical parody of the television show Full House.
The Full Monty	2000	Broadway	David Yazbek	Yazbek	Terrence McNally	Based on the 1997 film version.
Fun Home	2015	Broadway	Jeanine Tesori	Lisa Kron	Lisa Kron	Based on the 2006 graphic memoir Fun Home by Alison Bechdel.
Funny Face + film (1957)	1927	Broadway	George Gershwin	Ira Gershwin	Paul Gerard Smith and Fred Thompson	
Funny Girl + film (1968)	1964	Broadway	Jule Styne	Bob Merrill	Isobel Lennart	Notable songs: "People" and "Don't Rain on My Parade".
Funny Lady	1975	Film	John Kander	Fred Ebb	Jay Presson Allen and Arnold Schulman	
A Funny Thing Happened on the Way to the Forum	1962	Broadway	Stephen Sondheim		Burt Shevelove and Larry Gelbart	Notable song: "Comedy Tonight".

== G ==
G
Production	Year	Venue/type	Music	Lyrics	Book	Notes
The Gardens of Anuncia	2023	Off-Broadway	Michael John LaChiusa	LaChiusa	LaChiusa	Based on the life of Graciela Daniele
Gatsby: An American Myth	2024	Regional	Florence Welch and Thomas Bartlett	Welch	Martyna Majok	
Gay Divorce + film (1934)	1932	Broadway	Cole Porter	Porter	Dwight Taylor	Notable song: "Night and Day".
The Gay Life	1961	Broadway	Arthur Schwartz	Howard Dietz	Fay Kanin and Michael Kanin	Based on The Affairs of Anatol by Arthur Schnitzler.
Gay Purr-ee	1962	Animated film	Harold Arlen	E.Y. Harburg	Dorothy Webster Jones and Chuck Jones	
A Gentleman's Guide to Love and Murder	2013	Broadway	Steven Lutvak	Robert L. Freedman and Lutvak	Freedman	Notable songs: "Poison in my Pocket" and "I've Decided to Marry You"
Gentlemen Prefer Blondes + film (1953)	1949	Broadway	Jule Styne	Leo Robin	Joseph Fields and Anita Loos	Notable song: "Diamonds are a Girl's Best Friend".
George M!	1968	Broadway	George Cohan (revised Mary Cohan)	George Cohan	Michael Stewart, John Pascal and Francine Pascal	Notable song: "Yankee Doodle Dandy".
Get Up, Stand Up! The Bob Marley Musical	2021	West End	Bob Marley	Bob Marley	Lee Hall	
Gettin' the Band Back Together	2018	Broadway	Mark Allen	Allen	Ken Davenport and the Grundleshotz	
Ghost	2011	West End	Dave Stewart and Glen Ballard	Stewart, Ballard and Bruce Joel Rubin	Rubin	
Ghost Brothers of Darkland County	2012	Touring production	John Mellencamp	Mellencamp	Stephen King	
Gigi + film (1958)	1973	Broadway	Frederick Loewe	Alan Jay Lerner	Lerner	Notable song: "Thank Heaven for Little Girls".
The Girl Behind the Gun	1918	Broadway	Ivan Caryll	Guy Bolton and P. G. Wodehouse	Bolton and Wodehouse	Revised as Kissing Time in London.
Girl Crazy	1930	Broadway	George Gershwin	Ira Gershwin	Guy Bolton and John McGowan	Notable song: "I've Got Rhythm".
Girl From the North Country	2017	West End	Bob Dylan	Dylan	Conor McPherson	
The Girl in the Taxi	1910	Broadway	Benjamin Hapgood Burt	Burt	Stanislaus Stange	
The Girl Who Came to Supper	1963	Broadway	Noël Coward	Coward	Harry Kurnitz	
The Girls	2015	West End	Gary Barlow and Tim Firth	Barlow and Firth	Barlow and Firth	Based on the film Calendar Girls
The Glorious Ones	2007	Off-Broadway	Stephen Flaherty	Lynn Ahrens	Ahrens	
Glory Days	2008	Broadway	Nick Blaemire	Blaemire	James Gardiner	
The Go-Between	2011	Northampton / West End	Richard Taylor	Taylor and David Wood	Wood	
Go into Your Dance	1935	Film	Harry Warren	Al Dubin	Bradford Ropes and Earl Baldwin	
Goblin Market	1985	Off-Broadway	Polly Pen	Christina Rossetti	Rossetti	
Godspell + film (1973)	1971	Off-Broadway	Stephen Schwartz	Schwartz and Episcopal Hymnal	John-Michael Tebelak	
The Golden Apple	1954	Off-Broadway	Jerome Moross	John Latouche	Latouche	Based on the Iliad and Odyssey of Homer.
Golden Boy	1964	Broadway	Charles Strouse	Lee Adams	Clifford Odets and William Gibson	
Golden Rainbow	1968	Broadway	Walter Marks	Marks	Ernest Kinoy	
Goldilocks	1958	Broadway	Leroy Anderson	Jean Kerr, Joan Ford and Walter Kerr	Kerr and Kerr	
The Good Companions	1974	West End	André Previn	Johnny Mercer	Ronald Harwood	
Good News	1927	Broadway	Ray Henderson	B.G. DeSylva and Lew Brown	DeSylva and Laurence Schwab	
Good Vibrations	2005	Broadway	Brian Wilson and The Beach Boys	Wilson and The Beach Boys	Richard Dresser	
The Goodbye Girl	1993	Broadway	Marvin Hamlisch	David Zippel	Neil Simon	Based on the 1977 film version.
Goodtime Charley	1975	Broadway	Larry Grossman	Hal Hackady	Sidney Michaels	Story of Joan of Arc, featuring Joel Grey and Ann Reinking
Goosebumps	2016	Newmark Theatre	Danny Abosch	John Maclay and Abosch	Maclay	Based on Goosebumps: Phantom of the Auditorium by R.L. Stine.
Grab Me a Gondola	1958	West End	James Gilbert	Gilbert and Julien More	More	
Grand Hotel	1989	Broadway	Robert Wright, George Forrest and Maury Yeston	Wright, Forrest and Yeston	Luther Davis	
A Grand Night for Singing	1993	Broadway revue	Richard Rodgers	Oscar Hammerstein II	Walter Bobbie	
The Grand Tour	1979	Broadway	Jerry Herman	Herman	Michael Stewart and Mark Bramble	
The Grass Harp	1971	Broadway	Claibe Richardson	Kenward Elmslie	Elmslie	
Grease + film (1978)	1972	Broadway	Warren Casey and Jim Jacobs	Casey and Jacobs	Casey and Jacobs	Notable songs: "Summer Nights", "Greased Lightnin'" and "We Go Together". The song "Hopelessly Devoted to You" was added to the film.
Grease 2	1982	Film	Louis St. Louis	St. Louis	Ken Finkleman	Sequel to the 1978 film adaptation.
The Great American Trailer Park Musical	2005	Off-Broadway	David Nehls	Nehls	Betsy Kelso	
Great British Bake Off	2022	Regional	Pippa Cleary	Jake BrungerPippa Cleary	Jake Brunger	Based on the British television baking competition of the same name
The Great Gatsby	2023	Broadway	Jason Howland	Nathan Tysen	Kait Kerrigan	Based on the 1925 novel of the same name by F. Scott Fitzgerald.
Great Lady	1938	Broadway	Frederick Loewe	Earle Crooker	Crooker	
The Great Waltz	1934	Broadway	Johann Strauss I and Johann Strauss II	Desmond Carter	Moss Hart	Based on the Strauss family feud.
The Greatest Showman + film (2017)	2026	Bristol	Benj Pasek; Justin Paul	Pasek and Paul	Tim Federle	
A Greek Slave	1898	West End	Sidney Jones and Lionel Monckton	Harry Greenbank and Adrian Ross	Owen Hall	
Greenwillow	1960	Broadway	Frank Loesser	Loesser	Lesser Samuels and Loesser	
Grey Gardens	2006	Off-Broadway	Scott Frankel	Michael Korie	Doug Wright	Adaptation of the 1975 documentary of the same name.
Grimm	2014	Off-Broadway	Thomas Zaufke	Peter Lund	Lund	Based on several fairy tales.
Grind	1985	Broadway	Larry Grossman	Ellen Fitzhugh	Fay Kanin	
Groundhog Day	2016	West End	Tim Minchin	Minchin	Danny Rubin	Based on the 1993 film Groundhog Day
Gutenberg! The Musical!	2023	Broadway	Scott Brown and Anthony King	Brown and King	Brown and King	
The Guy Who Didn't Like Musicals	2018	Los Angeles	Jeff Blim	Blim	Nick Lang and Matt Lang	
Guys and Dolls + film (1955)	1950	Broadway	Frank Loesser	Loesser	Jo Swerling and Abe Burrows	Notable songs: "Luck Be a Lady", "A Bushel and a Peck" and "Sit Down, You're Rockin' the Boat".
Gypsy + film (1962)	1959	Broadway	Jule Styne	Stephen Sondheim	Arthur Laurents	Notable songs: "Everything's Coming up Roses" and "Together Wherever We Go".

== H ==
H
Production	Year	Venue/type	Music	Lyrics	Book	Notes
Hadestown	2019	Broadway	Anaïs Mitchell	Mitchell	Mitchell	Based on the 2010 folk opera concept album of the same name by Anaïs Mitchell.
Hair	1968	Broadway	Galt MacDermot	Gerome Ragni and James Rado		Notable song: "Aquarius".
Hairspray + film (2007)	2002	Broadway	Marc Shaiman	Scott Wittman and Shaiman	Mark O'Donnell and Thomas Meehan	Notable song: "You Can't Stop the Beat".
Half a Sixpence + film (1967)	1963	West End	David Heneker		Beverley Cross	Notable Songs: "Simple Tune" and "Flash, Bang, Wallop!".
Half a Sixpence	2016	West End	George Stiles and David Heneker	Anthony Drewe and David Heneker	Julian Fellowes	Based on the 1905 novel Kipps and the original 1963 musical.
Hallelujah, Baby!	1967	Broadway	Jule Styne	Betty Comden and Adolph Green	Arthur Laurents	
Hamilton	2015	Broadway	Lin-Manuel Miranda			Based on Alexander Hamilton by Ron Chernow; Opened on Broadway on 6 August 2015. Notable Songs: Non-stop and Room Where It Happens
Hands on a Hardbody	2013	Broadway	Trey Anastasio and Amanda Green	Amanda Green	Doug Wright	
Hans Christian Andersen	1952	Film	Frank Loesser		Myles Connolly and Moss Hart	
The Happiest Girl in the World	1961	Broadway	Jacques Offenbach	E.Y. Harburg	Fred Saidy	
The Happiest Millionaire	1967	Film	Richard M. Sherman and Robert B. Sherman		Cordelia Drexel Biddle and A.J. Carothers	Notable song: "Fortuosity".
Happiness	2009	Off-Broadway	Scott Frankel	Michael Korie	John Weidman	
Happy Days	1919	Broadway	Raymond Hubbell	R. H. Burnside		
Happy Days	2009	Off-Broadway	Paul Williams		Garry Marshall	
Happy End	1929	German	Kurt Weill	Bertolt Brecht	Elisabeth Hauptmann	Notable songs: "Bilbao Song" and "Sailor's Tango".
Happy Go Lovely	1951	Film	Mischa Spoliansky	Barbara Gordon, Mischa Spoliansky and Jack Fishman		
Happy Hunting	1956	Broadway	Harold Karr	Matt Dubey	Howard Lindsay and Russel Crouse	Notable songs: "Mutual Admiration Society" and "A New-Fangled Tango".
The Happy Time	1968	Broadway	John Kander	Fred Ebb	N. Richard Nash	
A Hard Day's Night	1964	Film	The Beatles and George Martin		Alun Owen	
Hard Road to Heaven	2025	Regional	David Spangler, Jerry Taylor, and Marty Dodson	Spangler, Taylor, and Dodson	Willy Holtzman	The musical had its world premiere at the Bucks County Playhouse in New Hope, Pennsylvania.
Harmony	1996	Off-Broadway	Barry Manilow	Bruce Sussman		Notable song: "Stars in the Night".
The Harvey Girls	1946	Film	Harry Warren	Johnny Mercer	Eleanore Griffin and William Rankin	
A Hatful of Snow	1994	American	Matthew Breindel	Breindel	Breindel	A Christmas musical.
The Hatpin	2005	Australian	Peter Rutherford	James Millar		
Hazel Flagg	1953	Broadway	Jule Styne	Bob Hilliard	Ben Hecht	
Head Over Heels	2015	Broadway	The Go-Go's	The Go-Go's	Jeff Whitty (original book) and James Magruder (adaptation)	
Heart and Souls	1993	Fantasy-comedy film	Ron Underwood			
The Heart of Rock & Roll	2018	Broadway	Huey Lewis and others	Huey Lewis and others	Jonathan Abrams	Jukebox musical featuring the music of Huey Lewis and the News.
Heathers	2014, 2018	Off-Broadway, West End	Laurence O'Keefe and Kevin Murphy			Based on the 1988 film of the same name. Notable songs: "Candy Store", "Freeze Your Brain", "Seventeen".
Hedwig and the Angry Inch + film (2001)	1998	Off-Broadway	Stephen Trask		John Cameron Mitchell	
Hell's Kitchen	2023	Broadway	Alicia Keys and others	Keys and others	Kristoffer Diaz	
Hello, Dolly! + film (1969)	1964	Broadway	Jerry Herman		Michael Stewart	Notable song: "Hello, Dolly!".
Hellzapoppin + film (1941)	1938	Broadway revue	Sammy Fain and Charles Tobias		Harold Johnson and Ole Olsen	
Help!	1965	Film	The Beatles, George Martin and Ken Thorne		Charles Wood and Marc Behm	
Henry, Sweet Henry	1967	Broadway	Bob Merrill	Merrill	Nunnally Johnson and Nora Johnson	
Her First Roman	1968	Broadway	Ervin Drake	Drake	Drake	
Hercules	1997	Animated film	Alan Menken	David Zippel	Ron Clements and John Musker	
Hercules	2019	Off-broadway	Alan Menken	David Zippel	Kristoffer Diaz	Played at the Delacorte Theater from 31 August to 8 September 2019.
Here Comes the Groom	1951	Film	Joseph J. Lilley	Lilley	Virginia Van Upp and Liam O'Brien	Featured the Academy Award winning song "In the Cool, Cool, Cool of the Evening".
Here Lies Love	2013	Off-Broadway	David Byrne and Fatboy Slim	Byrne		Based on the 2010 concept album by David Byrne and Fatboy Slim about the life of Imelda Marcos.
Here We Are	2023	Off-Broadway	Stephen Sondheim	David Ives	Sondheim	Based on the Luis Buñuel films The Discreet Charm of the Bourgeoisie and The Exterminating Angel
Here's Love	1963	Broadway	Meredith Willson	Willson	Willson	Based on the 1947 movie Miracle on 34th Street.
Hex	2021	West End	Jim Fortune	Rufus Norris	Tanya Ronder	Sleeping Beauty by Charles Perrault
High Button Shoes	1947	Broadway	Jule Styne	Sammy Cahn	George Abbott and Phil Silvers	
High Fidelity	2006	Broadway	Tom Kitt	Amanda Green	David Lindsay-Abaire	
High School Musical	2006	Film	Various artists	Various artists	Peter Barsocchini	
High School Musical 2	2007	Film	Various artists	Various artists	Peter Barsocchini	
High School Musical 2: On Stage!	2009	Touring production/Regional theatre/Community theatre	Various artists	Various artists	David Simpatico	Based on High School Musical 2 by Peter Barsocchini.
High School Musical 3: Senior Year	2008	Film	Various artists	Various artists	Peter Barsocchini	
High School Musical on Stage!	2007	Touring production/Regional theatre/Community theatre	Various artists	Various artists	David Simpatico	Based on High School Musical by Peter Barsocchini.
High Society + film (1956)	1998	Broadway	Cole Porter	Porter and Susan Birkenhead	Arthur Kopit	Adaptation of the 1956 film version. Notable song: "True Love".
High Spirits	1964	Broadway	Hugh Martin and Timothy Gray	Martin and Gray	Martin and Gray	
The Hobbit	1977	Television	Maury Laws	Jules Bass	Romeo Muller	
Hold Everything!	1928	Broadway	Ray Henderson	Lew Brown and B. G. De Sylva	De Sylva and John McGowan	
Holiday Inn + film (1942)	2014	Broadway	Irving Berlin		Gordon Greenberg and Chad Hodge	
Holy Musical B@man!	2012	Off-Off-Broadway	Nick Gage and Scott Lamps	Gage and Lamps	Matt Lang and Nick Lang	
Honeymoon in Vegas	2013	Broadway	Jason Robert Brown		Andrew Bergman	Based on the 1992 film of the same name.
Honk!	1993	Off-West End	George Stiles	Anthony Drewe	Drewe	
Hooray for What!	1937	Broadway	Harold Arlen	E. Y. Harburg	Howard Lindsay and Russel Crouse	
The Hot Mikado	1939	Broadway	Arthur Sullivan	W. S. Gilbert	Mike Todd	Based on Gilbert and Sullivan's The Mikado.
House of Flowers	1954	Broadway	Harold Arlen	Truman Capote and Arlen	Capote	
How Now, Dow Jones	1967	Broadway	Elmer Bernstein	Carolyn Leigh	Max Shulman	
How to Eat Like a Child	1981	Television	John Forster	Forster	Judith Kahan	
How to Succeed in Business Without Really Trying	1961	Broadway	Frank Loesser	Loesser	Abe Burrows, Jack Weinstock and Willie Gilbert	Notable songs: "I Believe in You" and "Brotherhood of Man".
Hoy No Me Puedo Levantar	2004	Spanish	Nacho Cano and José María Cano	Cano and Cano	David Serrano	
Huckleberry Finn	1974	Film	Richard M. Sherman and Robert B. Sherman	Sherman and Sherman	Sherman and Sherman	Based on Mark Twain's The Adventures of Huckleberry Finn.
The Human Comedy	1984	Broadway	Galt MacDermot	William Dumaresq	Dumaresq	
The Hunchback of Notre Dame + film (1996)	1999	Berlin	Alan Menken	Stephen Schwartz	James Lapine (Germany) and Peter Parnell (US)	Based on The Hunchback of Notre-Dame by Victor Hugo.
The Hunting of the Snark	1991	West End	Mike Batt	Batt	Batt	Based on Lewis Carroll's poem The Hunting of the Snark. Notable song: "The Snooker Song" (used as theme music for the TV show Big Break).

== I ==
I
Production	Year	Venue/type	Music	Lyrics	Book	Notes
I and Albert	1972	West End	Charles Strouse	Lee Adams	Jay Presson Allen	
I Can Get It for You Wholesale	1962	Broadway	Harold Rome	Rome	Jerome Weidman	
I Can't Sing!	2014	West End	Steve Brown	Brown, Harry Hill	Hill	Based on the Reality television show The X Factor
I Could Go on Singing	1963	Film	Harold Arlen	Arlen	Robert Dozier	
I Do! I Do!	1966	Broadway	Harvey Schmidt	Tom Jones	Jones	
I Love My Wife	1977	Broadway	Cy Coleman	Michael Stewart	Stewart	
I Love You Because	2006	Off-Broadway	Joshua Salzman	Ryan Cunningham	Cunningham	
I Love You, You're Perfect, Now Change	1996	Off-Broadway	Jimmy Roberts	Joe DiPietro	DiPietro	
I Married an Angel	1938	Broadway	Richard Rodgers	Lorenz Hart	Rodgers and Hart	
Identical	2022	Regional	George Stiles	Anthony Drewe	Stuart Paterson	Based on the novel Lisa and Lottie by Erich Kästner
Idol	2007	Off-Broadway	Jon Balcourt	Balcourt	Todd Ellis	Based on the popular TV show American Idol.
If/Then	2014	Broadway	Tom Kitt	Brian Yorkey	Yorkey	
Illya Darling	1967	Broadway	Manos Hadjidakis	Joe Darion	Jules Dassin	
Imagine Tap!	2006	Off-Broadway revue	Zane Mark	Crystal Joy	—N/a	
Imagine This	2008	West End	Shuki Levy	David Goldsmith	Glenn Berenbeim	
The Immigrant	2004	Off-Broadway	Steven M. Alper	Sarah Knapp	Mark Harelik	Based on Harelik's play, The Immigrant.
In Dahomey	1903	Broadway	Will Marion Cook	Paul Laurence Dunbar	Jesse A. Shipp	
In Strange Woods	2020	Podcast	Matt Sav and Brett Ryback	Jeff Luppino-Esposito and Brett Ryback	Brett Ryback and Jeff Luppino-Esposito and Matt Sav	
In the Green	2019	Off-Broadway	Grace McLean	McLean	McLean	Based on the lives of Hildegard of Bingen and Jutta von Sponheim
In the Heights + film (2021)	2008	Broadway	Lin-Manuel Miranda	Miranda	Quiara Alegría Hudes	
In Transit	2016	Broadway	Kristen Anderson-Lopez, James-Allen Ford, Russ Kaplan, and Sara Wordsworth	Anderson-Lopez, Ford, Kaplan, Wordsworth	Anderson-Lopez, Ford, Kaplan, Wordsworth	This is an a cappella musical.
In Trousers	1979	Off-Broadway	William Finn	Finn	Finn	
Interstella 5555: The 5tory of the 5ecret 5tar 5ystem	2003	Animated film	Various artists	Various artists	Thomas Bangalter, Guy-Manuel de Homem-Christo, Cédric Hervet and Leiji Matsumoto	
Into the Light	1986	Broadway	Lee Holdridge	John Forster	Jeff Tambornino	
Into the Woods + film (2014)	1987	Broadway	Stephen Sondheim		James Lapine	Notable songs: "No One is Alone" and "Children Will Listen".
Irene	1919	Broadway	Harry Tierney	Joseph McCarthy	James Montgomery and Joseph Stein	
Irma La Douce	1956	French	Marguerite Monnot	Alexandre Breffort	Breffort	
Is There Life After High School?	1982	Broadway	Craig Carnelia	Carnelia	Jeffrey Kindley	
It Ain't Nothin' But the Blues	1999	Off-Broadway revue	Various artists	Various artists	Charles Bevel, Lita Gaithers, Randal Myler, Ron Taylor and Dan Wheetman	
It Shoulda Been You	2011	Broadway	Barbara Anselmi	Brian Hargrove	Hargrove	
It's Only Life	2008	Revue	John Bucchino	John Bucchino	Daisy Prince and John Bucchino	

== J ==
J
Production	Year	Venue/type	Music	Lyrics	Book	Notes
Jackpot	1944	Broadway	Vernon Duke	Howard Dietz	Guy Bolton, Sidney Sheldon and Ben Roberts	
Jacques Brel is Alive and Well and Living in Paris	1968	Off-Broadway revue	Jacques Brel	Brel, Eric Blau and Mort Shuman	Blau and Shuman	
Jagged Little Pill	2018	Broadway	Alanis Morissette and Glen Ballard	Alanis Morissette	Diablo Cody	
Jamaica	1957	Broadway	Harold Arlen	E. Y. Harburg	Harburg and Fred Saidy	
James and the Giant Peach	2010	Broadway	Pasek and Paul	Pasek and Paul	Timothy Allen McDonald	Based on James and the Giant Peach by Roald Dahl
James Joyce's The Dead	1998	Broadway	Shaun Davey	Richard Nelson	Nelson	
Jane Eyre	2000	Broadway	Paul Gordon	Gordon	John Caird	Based on Jane Eyre by Charlotte Brontë.
Jekyll & Hyde	1997	Broadway	Frank Wildhorn	Leslie Bricusse, Wildhorn and Steve Cuden	Bricusse	
Jelly's Last Jam	1992	Broadway	Jelly Roll Morton and Luther Henderson	Susan Birkenhead	George C. Wolfe	
Jerico-Jim Crow	1964	Off-Broadway	Various artists	Various artists	William Hairston and Langston Hughes	
Jerome Robbins' Broadway	1989	Broadway revue	Various artists	Various artists	—N/a	
Jerry Springer	2003	West End	Richard Thomas	Thomas and Stewart Lee	Thomas and Lee	Based on the television show The Jerry Springer Show.
Jerry's Girls	1985	Broadway revue	Jerry Herman	Herman	—N/a	
Jersey Boys + film (2014)	2005	Broadway jukebox	Bob Gaudio	Bob Crewe	Marshall Brickman and Rick Elice	
Jesus Christ Superstar + film (1973)	1971	Broadway	Andrew Lloyd Webber	Tim Rice	Rice	Notable songs: "I Don't Know How to Love Him", "Heaven on Their Minds", "Everything's Alright", and "Gethsemane".
Jo	1964	Off-Broadway				
Joan of Arc: Into the Fire	2017	Off-Broadway	David Byrne	Byrne	Byrne	
john & jen	1995	Off-Broadway	Andrew Lippa	Tom Greenwald	Lippa and Greenwald	
John Henry	1940	Broadway	Jacques Wolfe	Roark Bradford	Bradford	
John Paul Jones	2001	Scottish	Julian Wagstaff	Julian Wagstaff	Julian Wagstaff and Joel Jenkins	Based on the life of the Scots-born naval captain and hero of the American Revolution
Johnny Johnson	1936	Broadway	Kurt Weill	Paul Green	Green	Based on Jaroslav Hašek's novel, The Good Soldier Švejk.
Johnny Pye and the Fool-Killer	1993	Off-Broadway	Randy Courts	Mark St. Germain	Courts and Germain	
Jolly Jerome	1928	Off-Broadway	Roy French	French		
Joseph and the Amazing Technicolor Dreamcoat + film (1999)	1968	West End	Andrew Lloyd Webber	Tim Rice	Rice	Notable songs: "Any Dream Will Do" and "Close Every Door".
Joseph McCarthy is Alive and Living in Dade County	1977	Off-Broadway	Ray Scantlin	Scantlin	Scantlin	
Juan Darién	1996	Broadway	Elliot Goldenthal	Goldenthal	Goldenthal and Julie Taymor	
Jubilee	1935	Broadway	Cole Porter	Porter	Moss Hart	
Jumbo	1935	Broadway	Richard Rodgers	Lorenz Hart	Ben Hecht and Charles MacArthur	
Jump for Joy	1941	Off-Broadway revue	Duke Ellington and Hal Borne	Paul Francis Webster and Sid Kuller	—N/a	Aimed at Broadway but closed out of town in Los Angeles.
The Jungle Book	1967	Animated film	Robert B. Sherman and Richard M. Sherman	Sherman and Sherman	Larry Clemmons	
Junie B Jones the Musical	2004	Off-Broadway	Zina Goldrich	Marcy Heisler	Marcy Heisler	Based on the Junie B. Jones book series by Barbara Park
Juno	1959	Broadway	Marc Blitzstein	Blitzstein	Joseph Stein	

== K ==
K
Production	Year	Venue/type	Music	Lyrics	Book	Notes
Ka-Boom!	1980	Off-Broadway	Joe Ercole	Bruce Kluger	Bruce Kluger	A musical about the end of the world, directed by John-Michael Tebelak.
Katdashians! Break the Musical!	2016	Off-Broadway	Bob and Tobly McSmith	Bob and Tobly McSmith	Bob and Tobly McSmith	A musical parody of the Kardashians.
Kathy & Stella Solve a Murder!	2024	West End	Matthew Floyd Jones	Jon Brittain & Jones	Brittain	Two true crime podcasters get thrust into a thrilling true crime of their own.
Kean	1961	Broadway	Robert Wright and George Forrest	Wright and Forrest	Peter Stone	
Keating!	2007	Australian	Casey Bennetto	Bennetto	Bennetto	Portrays the political career of former Australian Prime Minister Paul Keating.
Kelly	1965	Broadway	Moose Charlap	Eddie Lawrence	Lawrence	Never officially opened on Broadway.
The Kid	2010	Off-Broadway	Andy Monroe	Jack Lechner	Michael Zam	Based on the memoir by Dan Savage.
Kimberly Akimbo	2021	Off-Broadway	Jeanine Tesori	David Lindsay-Abaire	David Lindsay-Abaire	Kimberly Akimbo
The King and I + film (1956)	1951	Broadway	Richard Rodgers	Oscar Hammerstein II	Hammerstein II	Notable songs: "Shall We Dance", "I Whistle a Happy Tune" and "Getting to Know You".
King David	1997	Broadway	Alan Menken	Tim Rice	Rice	
King Kong	2013	Broadway	Marius de Vries	Eddie Perfect	Jack Thorne	Based on the 1933 film on the same name.
Kinky Boots	2013	Broadway	Cyndi Lauper	Lauper	Harvey Fierstein	Based on the 2005 film version.
Kismet	1953	Broadway	Alexander Borodin, Robert Wright and George Forrest	Wright and Forrest	Charles Lederer and Luther Davis	Notable song: "Stranger in Paradise".
Kiss Me, Kate + film (1953)	1948	Broadway	Cole Porter	Porter	Samuel and Bella Spewack	Notable song: "Too Darn Hot".
Kiss of the Spider Woman + film (2025)	1993	Broadway	John Kander	Fred Ebb	Terrence McNally	
Kissing Time	1919	Broadway	Ivan Caryll	Guy Bolton and P. G. Wodehouse	Bolton and Wodehouse	
Knickerbocker Holiday	1938	Broadway	Kurt Weill	Maxwell Anderson	Anderson	Notable songs: "September Song" and "It Never Was You".
KPOP	2017	Broadway	Helen Park and Max Vernon	Park and Vernon	Jason Kim	Based on the K-pop genre of music.
K-Pop Demon Hunters	2025	Animated film	Marcelo Zarvos (score) and various artists (songs)	Various artists		Notable songs: "How It's Done", "Golden" and "What It Sounds Like".
Kristina från Duvemåla	1995	Swedish	Benny Andersson	Björn Ulvaeus	Ulvaeus	
Kronborg: 1582	1974	Canadian	Cliff Jones	Jones	Jones	Based on William Shakespeare's Hamlet.
A Kurt Weill Cabaret	1963	Off-Broadway	Kurt Weill	Various artists	—N/a	
Kwamina	1961	Broadway	Richard Adler	Adler	Robert Alan Aurthur	

== L ==
L
Production	Year	Venue/type	Music	Lyrics	Book	Notes
La La Land	2016	Film	Justin Hurwitz	Pasek and Paul	Damien Chazelle	Notable songs "City of Stars" and "Audition (The Fools Who Dream)"
Labyrinth	1986	Film	David Bowie	Bowie	Terry Jones	
Ladies First	1918	Broadway revue	A. Baldwin Sloane	Harry B. Smith	Smith	Featuring songs by James Brockmann and James Kendl.
Lady and the Tramp	1955	Animated film	Sonny Burke and Peggy Lee	Burke and Lee	Erdman Penner, Joe Rinaldi, Ralph Wright, and Don DaGradi	Notable songs: "The Siamese Cat Song", "He's a Tramp", and "Bella Notte".
Lady, Be Good	1924	Broadway	George Gershwin	Ira Gershwin	Guy Bolton and Fred Thompson	
The Lady Comes Across	1942	Broadway	Vernon Duke	John La Touche	Fred Thompson and Dawn Powell	
Lady in the Dark + film (1944)	1941	Broadway	Kurt Weill	Ira Gershwin	Moss Hart	Notable songs: "Tschaikowsky (and Other Russians)", "My Ship" and "The Saga of Jenny".
The Last Empress	1995	Korean	Hee-Gap Kim	In-Ja Yang and Georgina St George	Mun-Yol Yi	
The Last Five Years + film (2014)	2003	Off-Broadway	Jason Robert Brown			Notable songs: "Still Hurting" and "I Can Do Better Than That".
The Last Session	1997	Off-Broadway	Steve Schalchlin	Schalchlin, John Bettis, and Marie Cain	Jim Brochu	
The Last Ship	2014	Broadway	Sting	Sting	John Logan and Brian Yorkey	
Laughing Room Only	2003	Broadway	Doug Katsaros	Katsaros	Dennis Blair and Digby Wolfe	
Leader of the Pack	1985	Broadway revue	Ellie Greenwich	Various artists	Anne Beatts	
Leap of Faith	2010	Broadway	Alan Menken	Glenn Slater	Janus Cercone and Slater	Based on the 1992 film of the same name.
Leben ohne Chris	2009	German	Wolfgang Böhmer	Peter Lund	Lund	
Legally Blonde	2007	Broadway	Nell Benjamin and Laurence O'Keefe	Benjamin and O'Keefe	Heather Hach	Based on the 2001 novel of the same name by Amanda Brown and the 2001 film of the same name. Notable songs: "Omigod You Guys", "Ireland", and "There! Right There!".
Legs Diamond	1989	Broadway	Peter Allen	Allen	Harvey Fierstein and Charles Suppon	
Lempicka	2018	Broadway	Matt Gould	Carson Kreitzer	Gould and Kreitzer	
Lend Me a Tenor	2011	West End	Brad Carroll	Peter Sham	Sham	
Lennon	2005	Broadway	John Lennon	Lennon	Don Scardino	
Leonard Sillman's New Faces of 1952 + film (1954)	1952	Broadway revue	Various artists	Various artists	—N/a	Notable song: "Boston Beguine".
Lestat	2006	Broadway	Elton John	Bernie Taupin	Linda Woolverton	Based on the vampire novels of Anne Rice.
Let It Ride	1961	Broadway	Jay Livingston and Ray Evans	Livingston and Evans	Abram S. Ginnes	
Let My People Come	1974	Broadway	Earl Wilson, Jr.	Wilson, Jr.	Wilson, Jr.	
Letters from Lehrer	2006	Canadian	Tom Lehrer	Lehrer	Richard Greenblatt	
Die letzte Kommune	2013	German	Thomas Zaufke	Peter Lund	Lund	
The Lieutenant	1975	Broadway	Gene Curty, Nitra Scharfman, and Chuck Strand	Curty, Scharfman, and Strand	Curty, Scharfman, and Strand	
The Life	1997	Broadway	Cy Coleman	Ira Gasman	David Newman, Gasman, and Coleman	
The Life and Adventures of Nicholas Nickleby	1980	West End	Stephen Oliver	Oliver	David Edgar	
Life Begins at 8:40	1934	Broadway revue	Harold Arlen	Ira Gershwin and E.Y. Harburg	—N/a	
The Light in the Piazza	2005	Broadway	Adam Guettel	Guettel	Craig Lucas	
The Light Princess	2013	Royal National Theatre	Tori Amos	Amos	Samuel Adamson	
The Lightning Thief: The Percy Jackson Musical	2017	Broadway	Rob Rokicki	Rokicki	Joe Tracz	Based on the book Percy Jackson and the Lightning Thief by Rick Riordan.
The Likes of Us	1965	Off-West End	Andrew Lloyd Webber	Tim Rice	Leslie Thomas	
Li'l Abner + film (1959)	1956	Broadway	Gene de Paul	Johnny Mercer	Norman Panama and Melvin Frank	
The Lion King + films (1994) and (2019)	1997	Broadway	Elton John	Tim Rice	Roger Allers and Irene Mecchi	Based on the film of the same name. Notable songs: "The Circle of Life", "Hakuna Matata" and "Can You Feel the Love Tonight".
The Lion King 1½	2004	Film	Don Harper	Harper	Tom Rogers	
The Lion King II: Simba's Pride	1998	Film	Nick Glennie-Smith	Glennie-Smith	Flip Kobler and Cindy Marcus	
Little by Little	1999	Off-Broadway	Brad Ross	Ellen Greenfield and Hal Hackady	Annette Jolles and Greenfield	
Little Fish	2003	Off-Broadway	Michael John LaChiusa	LaChiusa	LaChiusa	
Little Ham	1987	Off-Broadway	Judd Woldin	Richard Engquist and Woldin	Dan Owens	
Little Johnny Jones	1904	Broadway	George M. Cohan	Cohan	Cohan	
Little Mary Sunshine	1959	Off-Broadway	Rick Besoyan	Besoyan	Besoyan	
Little Me	1962	Broadway	Cy Coleman	Carolyn Leigh	Neil Simon	
The Little Mermaid + film (1989)	2008	Broadway	Alan Menken	Glenn Slater and Howard Ashman	Doug Wright	Based on the film of the same name. Notable songs: "Part of Your World", "Kiss the Girl" and "Under the Sea".
Little Miss Sunshine	2013	Off-Broadway	William Finn	Finn	James Lapine	Based on the film of the same name.
Little Nemo: Adventures in Slumberland	1993	Animated film	Richard M. Sherman and Robert B. Sherman	Sherman and Sherman	Chris Columbus and Richard Outten	
A Little Night Music	1973	Broadway	Stephen Sondheim		Hugh Wheeler	Notable song: "Send in the Clowns".
A Little Princess	2003	Off-Broadway	Andrew Lippa	Brian Crawley	Brian Crawley	
Little Shop of Horrors + film (1986)	1982	Broadway	Alan Menken	Howard Ashman	Ashman	Notable songs: "Suddenly, Seymour" and "Somewhere That's Green".
Little Tramp	1995	Off-Off-Broadway	David Pomeranz	Pomeranz	Pomeranz and Steven David Horwich	
Little Women	2005	Broadway	Jason Howland	Mindi Dickstein	Allan Knee	Notable song: "Astonishing". Based on the book of the same title by Louisa May Alcott.
Lizard Boy	2015	Seattle Rep	Justin Huertas	Justin Huertas	Justin Huertas	
Lizzie	2009	American	Steven Cheslik-DeMeyer and Alan Stevens Hewitt	Cheslik-DeMeyer and Tim Maner	Maner	Focuses on the involvement of Lizzie Borden in the axe murders of her father and stepmother, for which she was tried and acquitted, in 1892.
Lock Up Your Daughters	1959	West End	Laurie Johnson	Lionel Bart	Bernard Miles	
London Calling!	1923	West End revue	Noël Coward	Coward	André Charlot	
London Road	2011	Royal National Theatre	Adam Cork	Alecky Blythe	Blythe	
Lone Star Love	2004	Off-Broadway	Jack Herrick	Herrick	John L. Haber and Robert Horn	
Look to the Lilies	1970	Broadway	Jule Styne	Sammy Cahn	Leonard Spigelgass	
Lord of the Dance	1996	Dublin/Touring	Ronan Hardiman	Michael Flatley	—N/a	
The Lord of the Rings	2007	West End	A. R. Rahman, Värttinä and Christopher Nightingale	Matthew Warchus and Shaun McKenna	Warchus and McKenna	Based on the books by J. R. R. Tolkien.
Lorelei	1974	Broadway	Jule Styne	Betty Comden and Adolph Green	Kenny Solms and Gail Parent	
Loserville	2012	West End	James Bourne and Elliot Davis	Bourne and Davis		Based on the Son of Dork album Welcome to Loserville.
The Lost Boys	2026	Broadway	The Rescues	The Rescues	David Hornsby and Chris Hoch	Based on the 1987 film of the same name
Lost in the Stars + film (1974)	1949	Broadway	Kurt Weill	Maxwell Anderson	Anderson	
Louisiana Purchase + film (1941)	1940	Broadway	Irving Berlin		Morrie Ryskind	
Love from Judy	1952	West End	Hugh Martin	Martin and Timothy Gray	Eric Maschwitz and Jean Webster	
Love, Janis	2001	Off-Broadway revue	Various artists	Various artists	—N/a	
Love Life	1948	Broadway	Kurt Weill	Alan Jay Lerner	Lerner	
Love Never Dies	2010	West End	Andrew Lloyd Webber	Glenn Slater	Ben Elton	Sequel to the Lloyd Webber musical The Phantom of the Opera.
Love Story	2010	West End	Howard Goodall	Goodall and Stephen Clark	Clark	
LoveMusik	2007	Broadway	Kurt Weill	Various artists	Alfred Uhry	
Lucky Guy	2011	Off-Broadway	Willard Beckham	Beckham	Beckham	
Lucky Stiff	1988	Off-Broadway	Stephen Flaherty	Lynn Ahrens	Ahrens	Based on a novel by Mike Butterworth.
Ludwig II	2000	German	Franz Hummel	Stephan Barbarino	Barbarino	
Lust 'n Rust	2001	Off-Off-Broadway	Frank Haney, Carol Kimball and Dave Stratton	Haney, Kimball and Stratton	Haney, Kimball and Stratton	
Lysistrata Jones	2011	Broadway	Lewis Flinn	Flinn	Douglas Carter Beane	Based on the ancient Greek comedy Lysistrata by Aristophanes.
The Little Big Things (musical)	2023	Off-Broadway	Nick Butcher	Nick Butcher and Tom Ling	Joe White	Based on the Book "The Little Big Things" by Henry Fraser.
Little Miss Perfect	2026	Off-Broadway (link needed to Olney Theatre Center, MD)				

== See also ==
- List of musicals: M to Z
- List of notable musical theatre productions
- List of operettas
- List of Bollywood films
- List of rock musicals
