= Richard Greenblatt =

Richard Greenblatt may refer to:

- Richard Greenblatt (programmer) (born 1944), American computer programmer
- Richard Greenblatt (playwright) (born 1953), Canadian actor and playwright
