= Letters from Lehrer =

Play by Richard Greenblatt

- Poster for Letters from Lehrer
- Written by: Richard Greenblatt

Premiere
- Date premiered: January 16, 2006
- Place premiered: Toronto

Letters from Lehrer is a play written by Canadian playwright Richard Greenblatt, and performed by him at CanStage, from 16 January to 25 February 2006. It follows Tom Lehrer's musical career, the meaning of several of his songs, the politics of the time when he wrote the songs, and Greenblatt's own experiences with Lehrer's music, while playing some of Lehrer's songs intermittently. There are currently no plans for more performances, although low-quality audio files have begun to circulate the Internet.
