= Richard Greenblatt (playwright) =

Canadian playwright (born 1953)

Richard Greenblatt (born 1953) is a Canadian playwright who currently lives in Toronto. He is best known for 2 Pianos, 4 Hands, which he wrote and performed with Ted Dykstra.

== Early life ==
Greenblatt was born in 1953 in Montreal, Quebec, to a secular Jewish family. His parents were active Communists until 1956, when they left the party after Khrushchev's Secret Speech. He is the brother of Lewis Furey, musician, actor & director.

Greenblatt attended Dawson College. He later trained at the Royal Academy of Dramatic Art in London. In 1975 he returned to Canada and began his theatrical career.

== Works ==
- Soft Pedalling (1981)
- The Theory of Relatives (1994, co-written with Daniel Brooks, Diane Flacks, Leah Cherniak, Leslie Lester, and Allan Merovitz)
- 2 Pianos, 4 Hands (1994)
- Sibs (2000)
- Letters From Lehrer (2006)

== Personal life ==
Greenblatt was married to director/writer Kate Lushington. The two have three children: Natasha, William, and Luke.

== See also ==
- List of Canadian writers
- List of Canadian playwrights
