= Louise Heger =

Belgian artist (1839–1933)

- Born: Elisa Marie Louise Hortence Heger; 14 July 1839; Brussels, Belgium
- Died: 21 July 1933 (aged 94); Ixelles, Belgium
- Known for: Painting
- Movement: Impressionism
- Parents: Constantin Heger (father); Zoe Claire Heger née Parent (mother)
- Relatives: Paul Heger (brother)

Elisa Marie Louise Hortence Heger (also spelled Élisa (or Lisa) Marie Louise Hortense Héger, 14 July 1839 – 21 July 1933) was a painter, primarily of landscapes. She was one of the leading figures of the Belgian Impressionist movement. Alongside her artistic career, she taught art at the Heger family's boarding school.

== Biography ==
=== Family ===
Elisa Marie Louise Hortence Heger was born on 14 July 1839 in Brussels to Constantin Heger and his wife Zoe née Parent. She grew up in a family that supported progressive values and had economic resources. Her father was a professor at the Athénée de Bruxelles, and her mother ran a boarding school for girls in Brussels, where Emily and Charlotte Brontë were educated, (Note: The Brontë sisters knew Louise as a small girl; she may have inspired the character of one of Madame Beck's children in Villette, either Fifine or Georgette.) and was close to the feminist writer Zoé de Gamond. Louise also attended the school, with singing and drawing being her favourite subjects. The family circle in which Louise moved was also close to Belgian artistic circles. Her brother, Paul Heger, married Léontine van Mons, who was the sister of the patron Emile van Mons and the niece of the poet and art critic Émile Verhaeren. Her sister, Victorine Heger, married Emile Picard, the brother of the collector and art critic Edmond Picard.

=== Artistic training ===
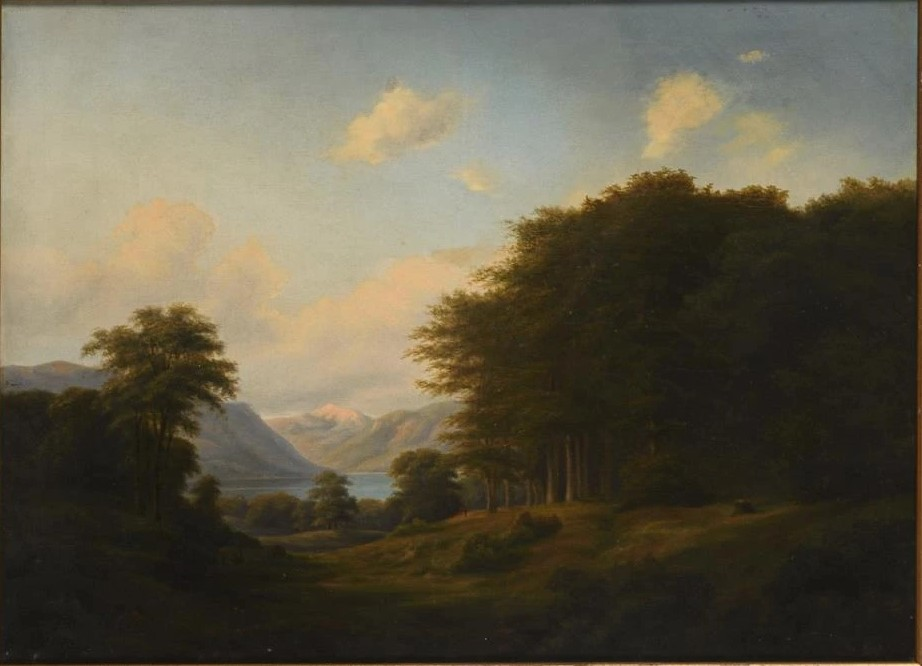
Forest Landscape

Artistic training was inaccessible to women in Belgium before the 1880s, and so Louise Heger pursued alternative paths that allowed her to acquire painting technique and aesthetic sensitivity, as well as to expand her social capital.

She attended her family's institute, the Pensionnat Heger, and benefited from the teachings of the artist Paul Lauters. He taught her the technical fundamentals of drawing, engraving, and oil painting. He also introduced her to the art of landscape painting. While initially her landscape studies were carried out in the studio and from prints, he soon introduced her to painting en plein air.

At that time a woman had to be accompanied or chaperoned when out painting or sketching en plein air; however, she took advantage of the revival of landscape painting genre then taking place in Belgium to educate her eye through contact with male counterparts and their works: from the 1870s onwards, Heger frequented the artists' colonies established in Genk and Tervuren. There she rubbed shoulders with Alphonse Asselbergs, Joseph Coosemans, and Théodore T'Scharner.

Dissatisfied with local landscapes and financially secure, she sought inspiration beyond the Belgian borders, and visited Italy, Switzerland, and Norway. When she was unable to practise outdoors, Heger went to the Royal Museums of Fine Arts of Belgium where she practised copying the works on display. In 1883, she joined the women's studio of the Belgian painter Alfred Stevens, based in Paris. The teaching provided in this private workshop finally gave her the opportunity to try her hand at human representation. Above all, it allowed her to perfect her use of oil and to familiarise herself with the impressionist aesthetic.

=== Artistic career ===
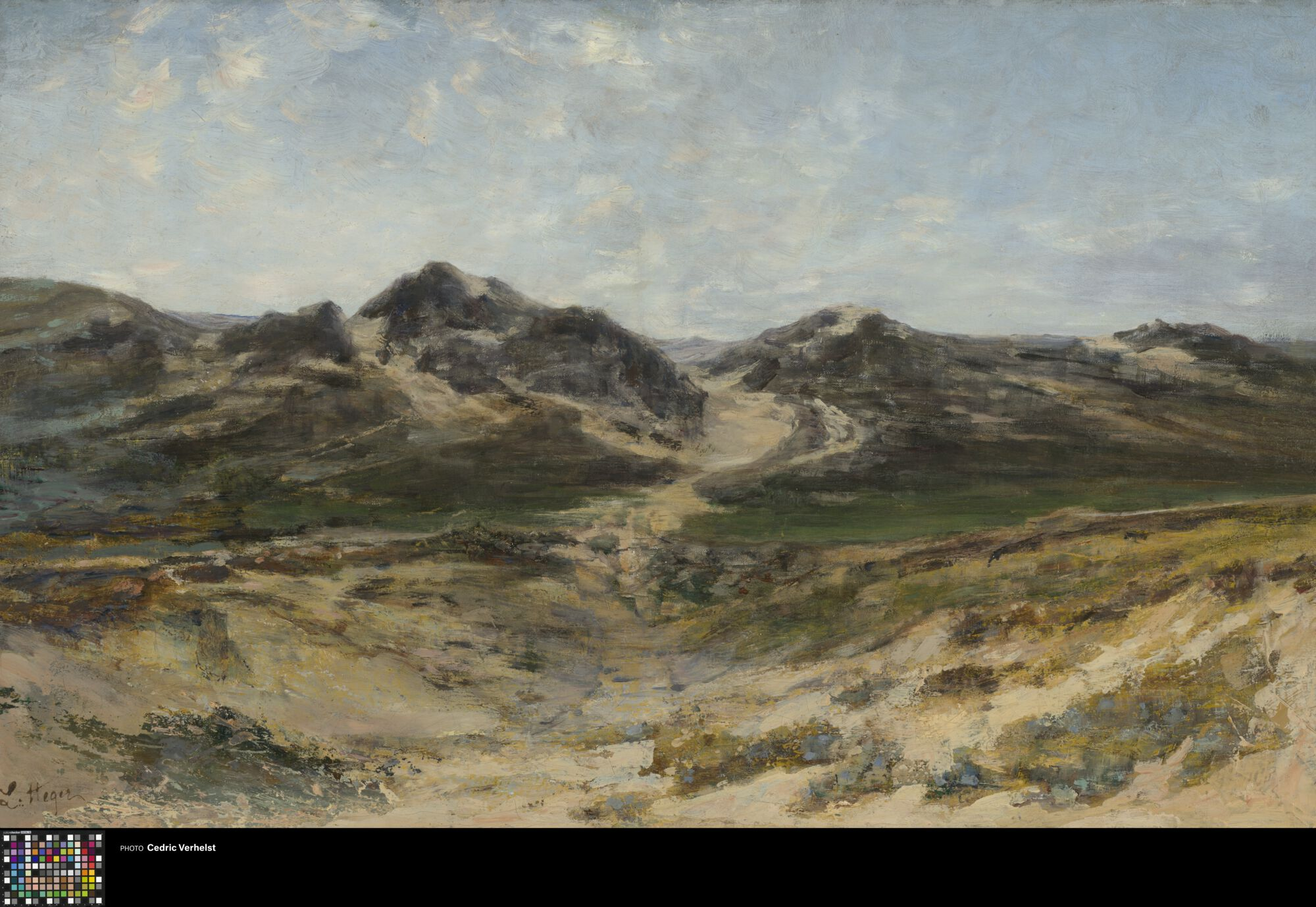
Fishermen's Route in Coxyde

Louise Heger's artistic interests and ambitions imply that she adopted a behaviour outside the social norms assigned to women at the time: she freed herself from the domestic sphere to paint from nature and she chose to remain single in order to practise her art regularly. This lifestyle was only feasible after a compromise with her parents: by hiring her as an art teacher at the Heger boarding school, they ensured that their daughter remained close to Brussels and that she also had a salary.

Heger painted primarily landscapes. Under the impetus of the painters of the Société Libre des Beaux-Arts, landscape paintings soon crystallised the issues of pictorial modernity in Belgium, and they now occupied the walls. Building on the relationships she had established with cultural figures, Heger participated in the annual exhibitions of the Brussels Artistic and Literary Circle in 1873, 1874, and 1878. Two of her works, entitled Le ruisseau du Hoyoux (The Hoyoux Stream) and the Sémois au printemps (Sémois in Spring), were exhibited at the Paris Salon of 1879. She repeated the experience at the Paris Salon in 1884 under the guidance of her teacher and painter Alfred Stevens. Her presence on the national and international art scenes was noted, and her works were discussed. She soon began receiving commissions from bourgeois families eager to decorate their homes, such as Emile van Mons.

During the following decade, a turning point occurred in Louise Heger's artistic career. On the one hand, she freed herself from her parents' guardianship by ending her teaching activities at the boarding school. She opened her new independent studio on Rue Isabelle, which became as much a space for creation as it was for exhibitions, and she now devoted herself exclusively to the practice of her art. Furthermore, she managed to free herself from the aesthetic influences inherited from her relationships with landscape painters in the realist tradition.

Thanks to her network of contacts, Heger benefited from changes in the exhibition system: she frequented the private cultural circuits where the Brussels intelligentsia flocked to convert their economic capital into cultural capital. Her creations were included in the private collections of Ernest Solvay and Henri Van Cutsem. Alongside her participation in domestic salons, she continued to exhibit regularly at official Salons, and participated in all the annual national exhibitions from 1895 to 1900. One of her studies entitled Houffalize joined the public collections of the Royal Museums of Fine Arts of Belgium after being presented at the Brussels International Exposition of 1897. The work was lost during the Second World War and no image of the painting has survived.

Her brother, Paul Heger, used his influence among his huge network of friends and colleagues to find buyers for his sister's work.

=== Aesthetic trajectories of Louise Heger's works ===
Louise Heger drew her iconographic themes from the landscapes she encountered during her travels in Belgium and abroad: she depicted seascapes (Au bord du lac (By the Lake), undated), forest landscapes (Balade en forêt de Soignes (Walk in the Sonian Forest), undated), coastal landscapes (Vue des dunes (View of the Dunes), 1878), and urban landscapes (Vue prise du haut de l'escalier Belliard (View taken from the top of the Belliard Staircase), undated).

Technically, she painted in oils on canvases or small panels. While she took advantage of material developments that made it easier to transport outdoor painters' tools, her artistic practice remained heavily influenced by the vagaries of the weather on the one hand and her own availability on the other. She therefore continued to practise with charcoal or ink drawing throughout her career. She primarily produced nature studies, which served as visual and memorial supports for her future works, but some of her drawings, such as Vue sur la Forge Roussel (View of the Roussel Forge) (undated), are considered creations in their own right.

For a time marked by the legacy of Romantic art, she soon broke free from it. By painting from nature, Heger made observation of the subject a condition of her creative process. At the same time, she elevated the landscape to the status of the primary subject in her works. In this, she embraced the concerns of realist landscape painters. She sought to capture the authenticity of nature through its variations in light and was less interested in details than in the whole; the contours of her forms gradually disappeared in favour of a freer brushstroke that better captured the fleeting atmospheric effects that permeated the environment. In this respect, the motif of the sky occupied an important place in her compositions.

However, Heger gradually lost interest in faithfully capturing the landscape. While she continued to paint en plein air, she now sought to project her personal impressions onto the canvas, particularly those that united her with nature. This subjectivity was visually reflected in a less rigorous use of perspective techniques and in the physical presence of her gestures, resulting in a materially vigorous finish. Heger eliminated black from her palette and resorted to more subtle nuances. All these characteristics, visible in her late works such as Effet de lune (Moon Effect) (undated) and Village de Coxyde (Coxyde village) (undated), make Heger's work a precursor of Belgian Impressionism.

The aesthetic trajectory of her works also lies outside the visual norms expected of female artists. Unlike some female artists who remained prisoners of the private sphere, she managed to take over public space, in this case, nature.

== Death ==
In her 70s her health started to decline and she moved back to Brussels, where she outlived many of her contemporaries, dying on 21 July 1933, aged 94.

== Correspondence ==
Throughout her life, Louise Heger maintained an intense correspondence with the painter Alphonse Asselbergs. Her letters are preserved in the archives of the Museum of Fine Arts, Ghent.

In 1913, Louise Heger and her brother Paul donated to the British Museum four intimate letters written by Charlotte Brontë to their father Constantin. They are now in the British Library collection.

== Honours ==
- Knight of the Order of Leopold (19 March 1903).
- The village of Coxyde, where Heger owned a villa, named a square in her honour – "Louise Hegerplein".

== Works (non-exhaustive list) ==
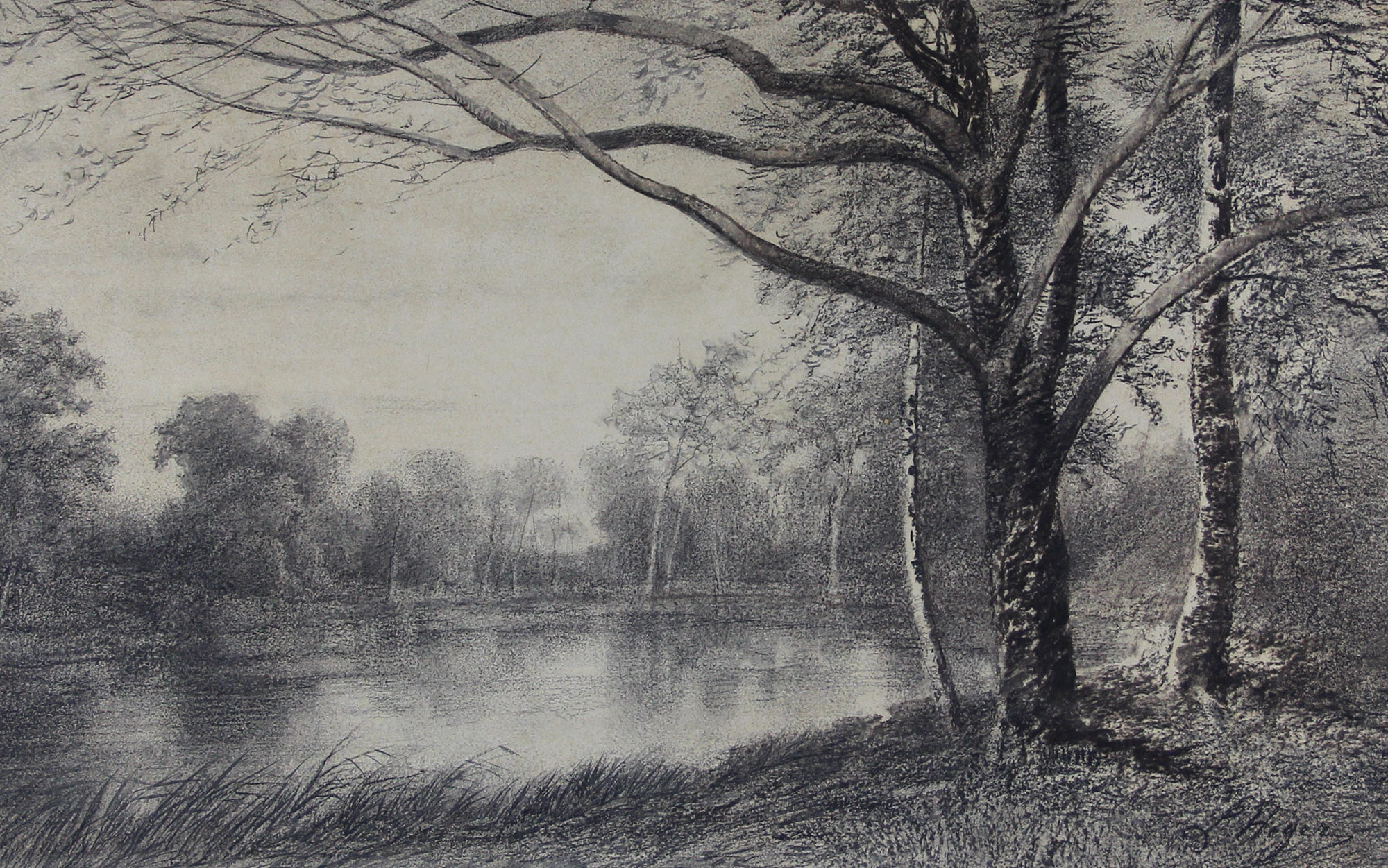
Landscape by the pond, charcoal

Many of Louise Heger's paintings are private owned, and relatively few are on public view in museums.

- Au bord du lac (By the Lake), undated, oil on canvas, 91 x 151 cm, signed lower right, undated
- Balade en forêt de Soignes (Walk in the Sonian Forest), undated, oil on canvas, 65 x 49.5 cm, unsigned, undated. (Tervueren, Friends of the School of Tervuren)
- Vue des dunes (View of the Dunes), [18]78, oil on canvas, 40 x 64.5 cm, signed and dated lower right. (Knokke-Heist, Sincfala Museum of the Zwinstreek)
- Vue prise du haut de l'escalier Belliard (View from the Top of the Belliard Staircase), undated, oil on canvas, 16.5 x 23 cm, unsigned, undated. (Private collection)
- Vue sur la Forge Roussel (View of the Roussel Forge), undated, ink on paper, 16.3 x 41.6 cm, unsigned, undated. In: PICARD (Edmond), La Forge Roussel, Brussels, 1880, pp. 18-19. (Brussels, KBR)
- Effet de lune (Moon Effect), undated, oil on panel, 24 x 38.5 cm, unsigned, undated. (Brussels, Ixelles Museum)
- Village de Coxyde (Village of Coxyde), undated, oil on canvas, 44 x 30 cm, unsigned, undated. (Tournai, Tournai Museum of Fine Arts)
- Verger à Tervueren (Orchard at Tervueren), undated, oil on canvas, 34 x 53.5 cm. (Location unknown)
- Paysage avec arbre près de la ferme (Landscape with Tree near the Farm), 1888, oil on panel, 24 x 33 cm. (Location unknown)
- A Dilbeek (In Dilbeek), undated, lithograph, 19.4 x 14.5 cm. (Brussels, KBR)
- Boqueteau, undated, engraving, 18 x 15 cm. (Brussels, KBR)
- Sienne (Siena), undated, watercolour on paper, 14.5 x 24 cm. (Free University of Brussels - Archives, Heritage, Precious Reserve Department)
- Sans titre (Village de montagne) (Untitled (Mountain Village)), 1892, watercolour on paper. (Free University of Brussels - Archives, Heritage, Precious Reserve Department)
- Baraque Michel, oil on canvas (Free University of Brussels - Archives, Heritage, and Precious Reserve Department)
- Paysage avec ferme (Landscape with Farm), oil on panel, 1891 (Free University of Brussels - Archives, Heritage, and Precious Reserve Department)

== See also ==
=== Bibliography ===
- Lemonnier, Camille (1906). L'école belge de peinture. 1830-1905 [The Belgian School of Painting 1830-1905] (in French). Brussels: G. van Oest & Cie. p. 111. OCLC 250482001.
- Berko, P.; Berko, V.; Hostyn, Norbert (1984). Marines des peintres belges nés entre 1750-1875 [Seascapes by Belgian painters born between 1750 and 1875] (in French). Brussels: Éditions Laconti. p. 76. ISBN 978-2-8700-8021-4. OCLC 13571109.
- Goyens de Heusch, Serge (1988). L'impressionnisme et le fauvisme en Belgique [Impressionism and Fauvism in Belgium] (in French). Anvers: Fond Mercator. pp. 44 & 460. ISBN 978-9-0615-3179-1. OCLC 22228676.

=== External links ===
- Media related to Louise Héger at Wikimedia Commons
- Zeebroek-Ollemans, Jany (1991). "Héger, Louise" [Dictionary of Belgian painters]. Dictionnaire des peintres belges (in French). Royal Institute for Cultural Heritage.
- Images of the Pensionnat Heger on the Brussels Bronte Group website
- Heger on the Brussels Bronte Group website
- Heger Historiography
