= At the Bottom of the River =

Short story collection by Jamaica Kincaid

- First edition
- Author: Jamaica Kincaid
- Language: English
- Genre: Postmodern literature, Short story collection
- Publisher: Farrar, Straus and Giroux (New York)
- Publication date: 1983
- Publication place: United States
- Media type: Print (hardback & paperback)
- Pages: 96 pp
- ISBN: 978-0-374-52734-1

At the Bottom of the River is a collection of short stories by Caribbean novelist Jamaica Kincaid. Published in 1983, it was her first short story collection. The collection consists of ten inter-connected short stories, seven of which were previously published in The New Yorker and The Paris Review between 1978 and 1982. Kincaid was awarded the Morton Dauwen Zabel Award of the American Academy and Institute of Arts and Letters in 1983 for the collection.

== Plot summary ==
The works in At the Bottom of the River are usually denoted as prose poems by critics.

“Girl,” is the first story in the collection. It was originally released on June 26, 1978, in The New Yorker and examines the struggles of growing up young and female on a post-colonial poor Caribbean island. “Girl” is a series of instructions, warnings and advice given by a mother to her daughter on how to behave especially in the presence of men. The mother frets about her daughter maturing into a woman, reflective of Jamaica Kincaid's own experiences growing up with her forceful mother in Antigua. The structure consists of a single sentence, punctuated by semi-colons, detailing the advice imparted from mother to daughter. The mother's voice is predominant in the narrative, only interrupted twice by the daughter who makes a feigned attempt to defend herself.

“In the Night” was first published in The New Yorker on July 24, 1978. It explores the mystery and danger of an Antiguan night from the perspective of an adolescent girl. While walking in the evening, the girl ponders the relationship between her and her mother and her stepfather and the society in which she lives. It ends with the girl's wish to hear her future wife tell her stories that begin with "Before you were born."

“At Last” takes the form of a dialogue between mother and daughter. This piece can be read as a companion to "In the Night" since it seems to be a mother's account of life before the birth of her child, responding to the final dilemma raised in “In the Night.” The mother here takes the opportunity to explain to her daughter some problematic issues while the daughter, an older child, echoes her jealousy and sense of neglect over the birth of her younger siblings.

“Wingless,” was first published in The New Yorker on January 29, 1979. It traces the young girl's search to define her identity, independent of her mother as she becomes increasingly more self-conscious.

“Holidays” follows the young woman through her quest for independence as she leaves home to take on a job as an au pair for an American couple. “It comprises an attempt to boost her self-image even as it communes on the division between life and art”. Kincaid herself had left her island home in Antigua at age 17 to take on a similar position working for an affluent family in Scarsdale, New York.

“The Letter from Home” was first published in The New Yorker on April 20, 1981. It is written in the form of a letter listing mundane household chores. The narrative perspective seems to shift liberally from mother to daughter. The daughter, having left home, is sent a letter informing her of what has taken place since her departure. “it chronicles the grief and pain of the domestic scene, and it transmits the sadness and loss of those who are left behind”.

“What I Have Been Doing Lately” was first published in The Paris Review in 1981. It chronicles the adventures of an unidentified narrator walking through an ever-changing and surreal landscape. “The narrator muses scenarios aloud to voice herself into an indeterminate environment, both visionary and material”. The story is about exploring the world.

“Blackness” is a despondent tale in which the narrator feels deeply isolated. “The daughter in “Blackness” experiences the detached calm of a dissociated state as she becomes swallowed up in the soft blackness. Absorbed in the blackness, cut off from the real world, she feels ‘annihilated’ and ‘erased,’ unable to point to herself ‘and say I’.

“My Mother” examines a power-struggle or love-hate relationship between mother and daughter. The young female narrator attempts to liberate herself emotionally and physically from her mother. “My Mother” exposes the daughter's burning anger and hatred for the all-powerful mother”.

“At the Bottom of the River” is the title story and the longest in the collection. The mother-daughter relationship is once again the main thematic focus. The young female narrator is now coming to terms with her identity and finally resolves to accept and embrace herself and her world. “The girl finds direction and substance, not so much in her visionary flights as in familiar objects: books, a chair, a table, a bowl of fruit, a bottle of milk, a flute made of wood. As she names these objects, she finds them to be reminders of human endeavor, past and present, though in themselves they are transient. She identifies herself as part of this endeavor as it betokens a never-ending flow of aspiration and creativity”.

== Themes ==
The stories focus primarily on female relationships, particularly the mother-daughter relationship. “The images and relationships of and between women dominate the stories”. The stories are told from the perspective of an Afro-Caribbean girl and cover such themes as the mother-daughter relationship, the potency and beauty of nature, the male-female divide, among others. The central theme of the mother-daughter relationship has been viewed by critics as an allegory to the relationship between the colonial masters and their colonies, specifically those in the Caribbean. This metaphor could also be extended to examine the relationship between the strong and the weak, the dominator and the dominated. At the Bottom of the River is deeply steeped with this sort of power struggle particularly from the perspective of a child and how she feels powerless over her environment or how the adult seeks to enforce control over, not only her actions, but also emotions. At the Bottom of the River also challenges traditionally assigned male-female roles, specifically questioning the expected role of women in a post-colonial society. The collection is also potent in highlighting the challenges children face growing up particularly in situations of poverty and the various demands that adults make of them. Perhaps one of the most pervasive themes is the search for identity, as a child, a teenager, a female and independent woman, an Afro-Caribbean, fighting against marginalization and alienation.

== Critique ==
Kincaid describes At the Bottom of the River as “a very unangry, decent, civilized book”. Critics, however, have found significant elements of anger and rebellion in her stories. They've noted anger at the colonial powers that oppressed her country post-Emancipation and, quite powerfully, unresolved, repressed anger against her own mother. These feelings are powerfully played out in each of her stories in the mother-daughter struggles it describes. The collection has been lauded, however, for its implicit examination of family relationships and the effects of colonialism on the Caribbean islands. Other critics dislike the fragmented, almost superficial, nature of the narrative, suggesting they lack adequate depth. Some critics also perceive that Kincaid did little to mask her own personal experiences in the stories, suggesting that they are too autobiographic in nature. Her personal struggles as a teenager growing up in post-colonial Antigua and her struggles with her mother are too vividly mirrored in the narratives of At the Bottom of the River. The most common debate over this work is its being categorized as a collection of short stories rather than poems. Critics believe that because of their writing style and fragmented nature, the pieces is more aptly described as prose poems. Critics have also identified considerable links between the unnamed narrator of At the Bottom of the River and the teenage Annie in her later 1985 novel, Annie John, suggesting that the novel is an expansion and completion of the earlier narratives.
