= Lucy (novel) =

1990 novella by Jamaica Kincaid

- 1990 first edition cover
- Author: Jamaica Kincaid
- Language: English
- Genre: Novella
- Publisher: Farrar, Straus & Giroux
- Publication date: September 1990
- Publication place: United States
- Media type: Print (hardback & paperback)
- Pages: 164 pp (first edition, hardback)
- ISBN: 0-374-19434-3 (first edition, hardback)
- OCLC: 22412663
- Dewey Decimal: 813 20
- LC Class: PR9275.A583 K5638 1990

Lucy (1990) is a novella by Jamaica Kincaid. The story begins in medias res: the eponymous Lucy has come from the West Indies to the United States to be an au pair for a wealthy white family. The plot of the novel closely mirrors Kincaid's own experiences.

Lucy retains the critical tone of A Small Place but simplifies the style of Kincaid's earlier work by using less repetition and surrealism. The first of her books set completely outside the Caribbean, Lucy, like most of Kincaid's writing, has a strong autobiographical basis. The novel's protagonist, Lucy Josephine Potter, shares one of Kincaid's given names and her birthday. Like Kincaid, Lucy leaves the Caribbean to become an au pair in a large American city. At nineteen, Lucy is older than previous Kincaid protagonists, which lends the book a more mature and cynical perspective than in her previous fiction. Still, Lucy has pangs of homesickness and unresolved feelings about her mother, and she has never lived on her own or seen much of the world. With plenty of room for growth and Lucy becoming a photographer, the story takes the form of a künstlerroman, a novel in which an artist matures.

Lucy also joins the tradition of American immigration literature, tales that recount a newcomer's experience in the United States, such as those seen in Anzia Yezierska’s Bread Givers, Willa Cather’s My Ántonia, and Julia Alvarez’s How the Garcia Girls Lost Their Accents. Along with exploring immigration, Lucy, as does much of Kincaid's work, grapples with tensions between mother and daughter. Colonial themes of identity confusion and the connection between maternal and imperial rule stand out less clearly in Lucy than in Kincaid's earlier books but have an underlying presence in Lucy's relationship with her white, affluent employers, her homeland, and her new surroundings.

== Plot summary ==
Eager to leave the West Indies, Lucy longs to leave her past behind. She does not feel nostalgic for her childhood and her homeland, where she felt oppressed by toxic colonial and family influences. However, on her arrival to North America, she reflects on the differences between the place that she had previously called home and where she now lives. She feels as if something is wrong because the sun is shining but the air is still cold. Additionally, she recalls fond memories of her grandmother along with her favorite foods from home that her grandmother would cook for her, both of which are no longer available to her. She moves to America to work as an au pair for a well-off family. Although she is initially enamored with their seemingly perfect life, she grows disillusioned with their lifestyle and feels alienated from the family. Despite this, she does grow close to the mother, Mariah, who reminds Lucy of both the good and bad in her own mother. The relationship between Lucy and her mother is a central theme. At one point in her relationship with Mariah, Lucy sees Mariah (her boss) and her mother as the same, because they both try to control Lucy. (At other times, Lucy feels like Mariah's friend.) Lucy also sees a resemblance when she sees Lewis, Mariah's husband, cheats on Mariah, because Lucy's own father cheated on her mother.

Throughout the book, Lucy's strained relationship with her mother drives her quest for independence and ability to create her own identity against that of her mother's. Lucy's mother was committed to her father, who had children by multiple other women. Angry that her mother valued proper, committed relationships (and taught Lucy to behave the same way) and still ended up hurt, Lucy attempts to identify herself against her mother through her multiple sexual encounters devoid of emotional attachment. This novel explores Lucy's sexuality as part of her identity search, illustrated through her various sexual encounters with men as well as her homoerotic relationship with her friend Peggy, whom Mariah dislikes for being a bad influence.

Lucy's father is not referred to as much as her mother is spoken about, so it is unclear what kind of relationship they have or if she feels as negatively towards him as she does towards her mother. Lucy's father was an older man when he married her mother, and she describes their arrangement as mutually beneficial. Her mother married someone who would not bother her too much, while she was still able to maintain appearances. Likewise, her father in his old age married someone in order to take care of him. Her father had several love affairs and children with other women before he married her mother. Some of these women tried to cause harm to both Lucy and her mother throughout their lives. Lucy's father was raised by his grandmother. His mother left him at the age of five and then at the age of seven his father left to work on the Panama Canal, and he never saw either of them again. His grandmother then died in the middle of the night one night and did not wake up the next morning.

Lucy's mother writes her many letters while she works as an au pair, but, feeling betrayed by her mother for funding her half-siblings' education over hers, she refuses to open them. When she receives notice that her father died, she hastily sends her mother money, along with a letter cutting off all communication from her. Further fueling her desire to move away from the disenchanting life of Mariah's family, she leaves on hostile terms with Mariah, moves in with Peggy and begins a relationship with a man named Paul. Despite her newfound independence, she still remains emotionally cut off from her relationships, not returning the love for Paul that he professes to her. Although by the end of the novel she reestablishes a relationship with Mariah, her independence that she sought from childhood has not been fulfilling-the novel ends with Lucy wishing she "could love someone so much that she would die from it." Though she attempts to escape her past and detach herself from her roots, she consequently detaches herself from all relationships, leaving her feeling alone.

== Critical response ==
Lucy has often been interpreted through the dual lenses of postcolonial and feminist criticism. Gary E. Holcomb, for example, sees the novel as endorsing a black transnationalism view, as Lucy refuses to be constrained by "colonial, racist, and transnational values" of either Antigua or the United States. Edyta Oczkowicz similarly describes Lucy's learning to tell her own story as an act of self-translation, in which she must create "a new personal 'space'" in which her identity "does not have to be defined by the roles of either colonized or colonizer."

Critics have also focused on the many intertexts on which the novel draws. Diane Simmons details the way in which the novel draws on John Milton's Paradise Lost and Charlotte Brontë's Jane Eyre, noting that Brontë was Kincaid's favorite author. David Yost observes that Lucy contains many correspondences to another Brontë novel, Villette—including the names of its primary couple (Lucy and Paul), its plot (an au pair adjusting to a foreign culture), its themes (sexual repression of women and self-recreation through art), and its setting (Villette's Paul dies returning from his Caribbean slave plantation)--arguing that Lucy acts a postcolonial reworking of this earlier text. Ian Smith focuses on the scene in which Lucy must memorize Wordsworth's "I Wandered Lonely as a Cloud" at her boarding school, despite having never seen a daffodil in Antigua. Noting that this episode recurs throughout Kincaid's work, Smith asserts that the act here of transcending an oppressive and often-nonsensical colonial education is emblematic of Kincaid's oeuvre as a whole.
