= See Now Then =

Book by Jamaica Kincaid

First edition

See Now Then is the fifth novel of author Jamaica Kincaid, first published by Farrar, Straus and Giroux in 2013. Though reviewers were quick to note the many similarities between the characters in the novel and events in her life, Kincaid denied that the book was based on her divorce with Allen Shawn.

== Plot ==
Mr. and Mrs. Sweet live in a house formerly owned by Shirley Jackson with their two children Persephone and Heracles. As Mr. Sweet begins to grow bitter with his marriage Mrs. Sweet sinks into a depression.

== Reception ==
Dwight Garner, writing for The New York Times, called it "the kind of lumpy exorcism that many writers would have composed and then allowed to remain unpublished." The A.V. Club gave it a B− grade but criticized the work as "long-winded and unnecessarily repetitive." NPR gave a more generous review, saying that it was "one of the most damning retaliations by a jilted wife since Nora Ephron's Heartburn."

Kincaid hit back at the criticism, saying, "It's painful, in its way, to be dismissed because, 'Well, it's about her marriage and revenge or something.' It's not that at all."
