= Villette (novel) =

1853 novel by Charlotte Brontë

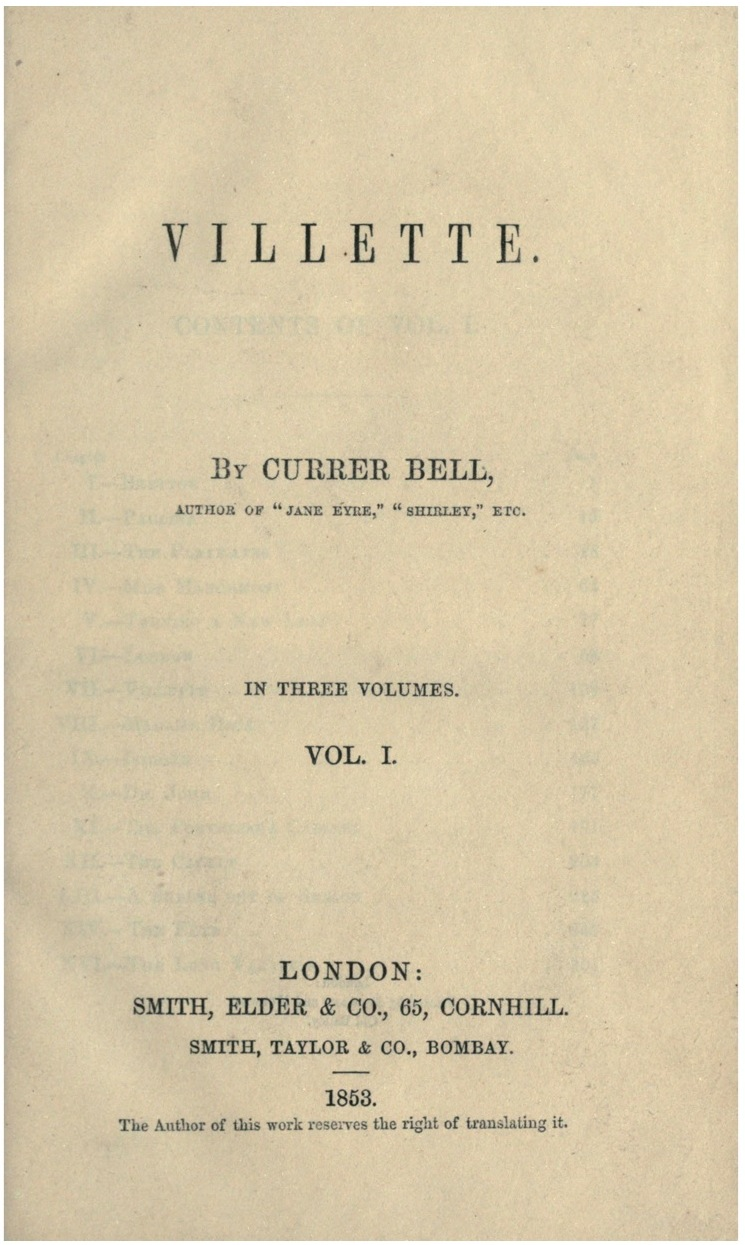
- Title page of the first edition, 1853
- Author: Charlotte Brontë
- Language: English
- Genre: Romance novel, psychological fiction
- Publisher: Smith, Elder & Co.
- Publication date: 27 January 1853
- Publication place: United Kingdom
- Media type: Print: hardback octavo
- Pages: 672, in 3 volumes
- Dewey Decimal: 823.8
- LC Class: PR4167 .V5
- Preceded by: Shirley
- Followed by: The Professor
- Text: Villette at Wikisource

Villette (/vɪˈlɛt/ vi-LET) is an 1853 novel written by English author Charlotte Brontë. After an unspecified family disaster, the protagonist Lucy Snowe travels from her native England to the fictional Continental Europe city of Villette to teach at a girls' school.

Villette was Charlotte Brontë's third and last novel published during her life. It was preceded in writing by The Professor (her posthumously published first novel, of which Villette is a reworking, though still not very similar), Jane Eyre, and Shirley.

== Author's background ==
In 1842 Charlotte Brontë, at the age of 26, travelled to Brussels, Belgium, with her sister Emily. There they enrolled in a pensionnat (boarding school) run by M. and Mme. Constantin Heger. In return for board and tuition, Charlotte taught English and Emily taught music.

The sisters' time at the pensionnat was cut short when their aunt, Elizabeth Branwell, died in October 1842. Elizabeth had joined the Brontë family to care for the children after the death of her sister, their mother Maria Brontë, née Maria Branwell.

Charlotte returned, alone, to Brussels in January 1843 to take up a teaching post at the pensionnat. Her second stay in Brussels was not a happy one. She became lonely and homesick, and fell in love with M. Heger, a married man. She finally returned to her family's rectory in Haworth, England, in January 1844.

Charlotte drew on this source material for her first (albeit unsuccessful) novel The Professor. After several publishers had rejected it, Brontë reworked the material and made it the basis of Villette. Most literary historians believe that the character of M. Paul Emanuel is closely based upon that of M. Heger. Furthermore, the character of Graham Bretton is widely acknowledged to have been modelled upon Brontë's publisher, George Murray Smith.

== Locale ==
The novel is initially set in the English countryside, and later follows Lucy Snowe, the main character to the fictional town of Villette, a Gothic town where the majority of the action takes place. Villette is modelled upon the city of Brussels and is set in the fictional French-speaking kingdom of Labassecour (modelled on Belgium). "La basse-cour" is French for "the farmyard".

== Characters ==
Lucy Snowe: The narrator and main character of Villette. A quiet, self-reliant, intelligent, 23-year-old woman. Lucy has, as Miss Ginevra Fanshawe asserts, "no attractive accomplishments – no beauty" as Lucy does her best not to stand out or form attachments. Although she seems to lack any living relatives, she is the god-daughter of Mrs. Bretton.

Though usually reserved and emotionally self-controlled, Lucy has strong feelings and affections for those whom she really values. She even sincerely cares for the giddy Ginevra, albeit in a blunt, curmudgeonly fashion. She is a firm Protestant and denounces Roman Catholicism as false ("God is not with Rome"). She falls in love with M. Emanuel and consents to marry him someday. With his help Lucy leaves Madame Beck's and establishes her own school.

M. Paul Emanuel: An irascible, autocratic professeur at Madame Beck's pensionnat. He is also a relative of Madame Beck. Although he insults Lucy frequently, Lucy comes to relish his good qualities. He is generous; he delights in giving Lucy secret presents. He is kind and magnanimous, as is shown by his supporting and sheltering the elderly grandmother of his dead fiancée, Justine Marie, together with his former tutor (Père Silas) and a servant. He is a devout Catholic and tries to convert Lucy, a Protestant, to Catholicism but fails. As he grows closer to Lucy and falls in love with her everyone in his life attempts to keep them apart, and he is eventually banished to a family-owned plantation in Guadeloupe for three years. At the end of the novel, it is strongly hinted that he dies in a shipwreck attempting to return to Labassecour.

Dr. John Graham Bretton: A handsome young English gentleman who is a physician. He is the son of Lucy's godmother, Mrs. Bretton. He is described as "cheerful," "benignant," and "bland." Lucy, when young, showed no particular fondness for him. However, when they meet again ten years later, their cool friendship is more than rekindled, and Lucy secretly begins to cherish an affection for him. Graham does not return this affection, however, and calls her "quiet Lucy Snowe" and "a being inoffensive as a shadow." He has, at first, a passion for Ginevra Fanshawe, until her love of money and a sneer at Mrs. Bretton quenches his love at last. He then falls in love with Polly de Bassompierre. Lucy conquers her love for him and buries all his treasured letters to her, saying, "Good-night, Dr. John; you are good, you are beautiful but you are not mine. Good-night, and God bless you!" John and Polly eventually marry and live a happy life together.

Mrs. Louisa Bretton: Dr. John Graham Bretton's mother and Lucy's godmother. She is a widow and has "health without flaw, and her spirits of that tone and equality which are better than a fortune to the possessor." She is immensely proud of her son but is not above teasing him.

Polly Home (Countess Paulina Mary de Bassompierre): A 17-year-old English girl who is a cousin of Ginevra Fanshawe. She is first introduced to the story as a very young girl, who is called Polly. As a child, she was very fond of Graham Bretton. She grows to be a beautiful young lady who is delicate and intelligent. Upon meeting Graham again, their friendship develops into love, and they eventually marry. Lucy says of her, "She looked a mere doll," and describes her as shaped like "a model." She and Lucy are friends. Although Lucy is often pained by Polly's relationship with Graham, she looks upon their happiness without a grudge.

Mr. Home (Count de Bassompierre): Polly's father, who inherited his noble title within recent years. He is a sensitive and thoughtful man who loves his daughter. When he notices Polly's relationship with Graham, he has difficulty recognising and accepting that his daughter is now a grown woman. He regards her as a mere child and calls her his "little treasure" or "little Polly." He at last relinquishes Polly to Graham, saying, "May God deal with you as you deal with her!" He lives to a ripe old age.

Ginevra Fanshawe: A beautiful but shallow and vain 18-year-old English girl with a light, careless temperament. She is an incorrigible coquette and has a relish for flirtation. Although related to the Homes/Bassonpierres her own family is not wealthy, and she expects others to finance her lavish tastes. Lucy meets her on a ship journeying to France. Ginevra is a student at Madame Beck's, and it is her passing remark, "I wish you would come to Madame Beck's; she has some marmots [Fr. "kids"] you might look after: she wants an English gouvernante, or was wanting one two months ago," which prompts Lucy to go to Villette. Despite Ginevra's faults, Lucy has a certain fondness for her. Ginevra thinks of Lucy as "caustic, ironic, and cynical," calling her "old lady," "dear crosspatch," and most frequently "Timon" (after a Greek misanthrope who lived during the 5th century BC). Ginevra uses Graham shamelessly until he loses interest in her. She eventually elopes with and marries Count Alfred de Hamal and keeps in touch with Lucy via letters.

Count Alfred de Hamal: A colonel-count, Ginevra's suitor, has a Continental appearance with delicate features. Ginevra Fanshawe states "Colonel de Hamal is a gentleman of excellent connections, perfect manners, sweet appearance, with pale interesting face, and hair and eyes like an Italian. Then too he is the most delightful company possible—a man quite in my way; not sensible and serious like the other [Dr John]; but one with whom I can talk on equal terms". Lucy disagrees with her and describes the count as “The doll—the puppet—the manikin—the poor inferior creature! A mere lackey for Dr. John his valet, his foot-boy!"

Madame Modeste Maria Beck: The owner and headmistress of the boarding school for girls where Lucy is employed. She is short and stout, but not uncomely. Her complexion is described as fresh. "She looked well, though a little bourgeois … ." She has good sense and is an excellent administrator, though that is because she spies on everyone and goes through their possessions frequently. Lucy says, "[S]he had no heart to be touched: it reminded her where she was impotent and dead." Lucy further describes her as "wise, firm, faithless; secret, crafty, passionless; watchful and inscrutable; acute and insensate — withal perfectly decorous — what more could be desired?" She seems attracted to Graham at first, but that dies away quickly. She then seeks to marry M. Paul Emanuel to keep him and his fortune under her thumb. She does all she can to keep Lucy and Paul apart, including conspiring with Père Silas.

Rosine: The pretty but unprincipled portress at Madame Beck's boarding school. She is "smart, trim, and pert" and "not a bad sort of person," according to Lucy. She likes to be bribed.

Père Silas: An elderly Catholic priest who makes it his mission, and later M. Emanuel's, to convert Lucy. He is the mentor of Paul Emanuel, and uses the latter's love of the late Justine Marie to manipulate him. He is instrumental in keeping M. Paul and Lucy apart.

Justine Marie: A deceased noviciate nun, the former love of Paul Emanuel. She had originally hoped to marry him, but her family's objections led her to join a convent. During her time at Madame Beck's, Lucy suspects she is being haunted by Justine's ghost.

== Plot ==
Villette begins with its protagonist and unreliable narrator, Lucy Snowe, aged 13, staying at the home of her godmother Mrs. Bretton in "the clean and ancient town of Bretton", in England. Also in residence are Mrs. Bretton's teenaged son, John Graham Bretton (whom the family calls Graham), and a young visitor, Paulina Home (who is called Polly), who is aged 6. Polly's mother, who neglected her daughter, has recently died and her father is recommended by doctors to travel to improve his spirits. Polly is invited by Mrs. Bretton to stay. Polly is a serious little girl, who is described as unlike normal children.

Polly soon develops a deep devotion to Graham, who showers her with attention. But Polly's visit is cut short when her father arrives to summon her to live with him abroad.

For reasons that are not stated, Lucy leaves Mrs. Bretton's home a few weeks after Polly's departure. Some years pass, during which an unspecified family tragedy leaves Lucy without family, home, or means. After some initial hesitation, she is hired as a carer by Miss Marchmont, a rheumatic crippled woman. Lucy is soon accustomed to her work and has begun to feel content with her quiet, frugal lifestyle.

The night of a dramatic storm, Miss Marchmont regains all her energy and feels young again. She shares with Lucy her sad love story of 30 years ago, and concludes that she should treat Lucy better and be a better person. She believes that death will reunite her with her dead lover. The next morning, Lucy finds Miss Marchmont died in the night.

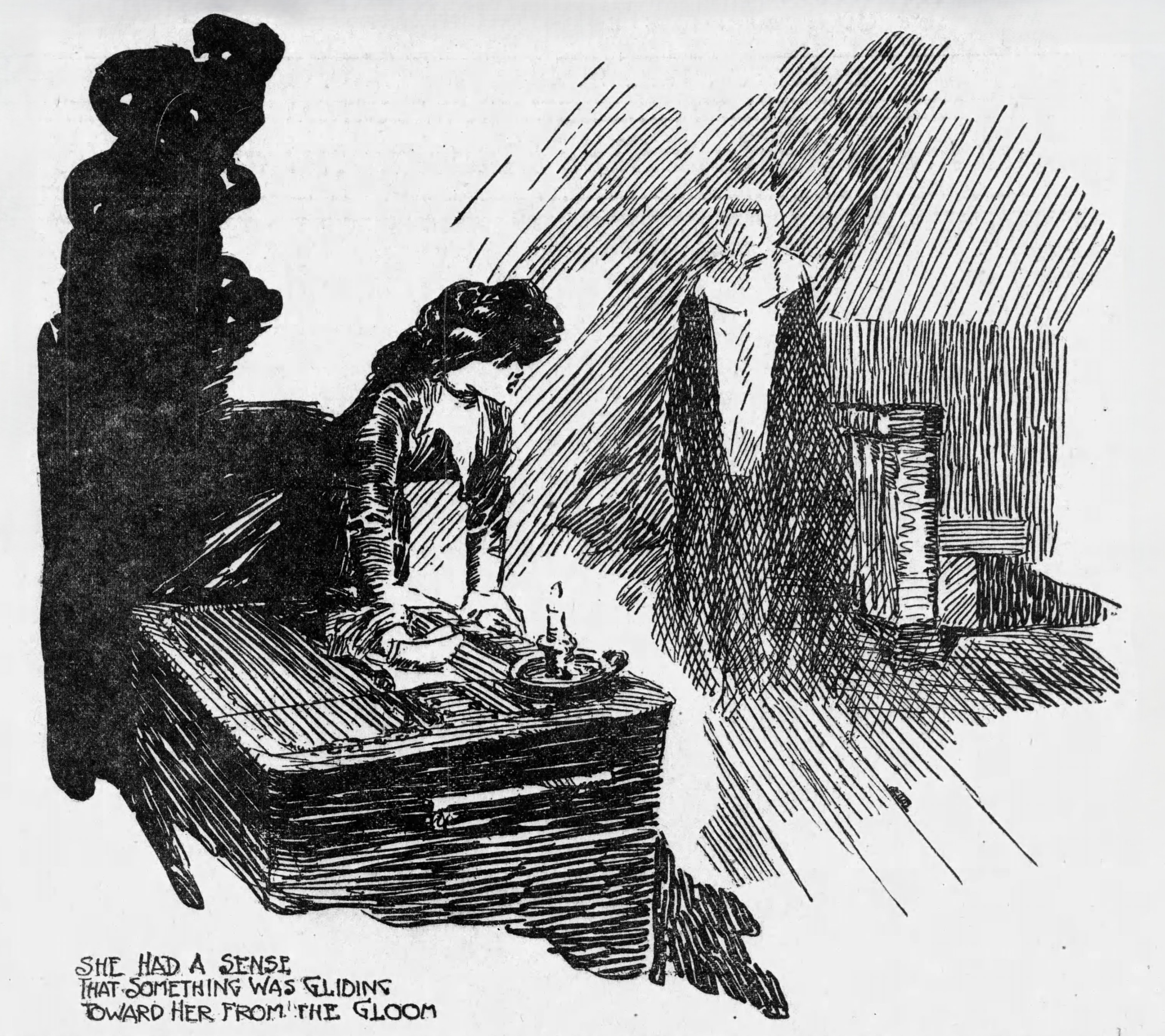
Newspaper illustration from abridged version of Villette, 1909

Lucy then leaves the English countryside and goes to London. At the age of 22, she boards a ship for Labassecour despite knowing very little French. On the ship, she meets Ginevra Fanshawe, who tells Lucy that the directress of her boarding school for girls (based upon the Hegers' Brussels pensionnat) she is attending, Madame Beck, needs a bonne for her children. She travels to the city of Villette in Labassecour where Madame Beck's school is located. After a time, she is hired to teach English at the school, in addition to having to mind Madame Beck's three children. She thrives despite Madame Beck's constant spying on the staff and students.

"Dr. John," a handsome English doctor, frequently visits the school at the behest of Madame Beck, and deepens his affection for the coquette Ginevra Fanshawe. In one of Villette's famous plot twists, "Dr. John" is later revealed to be John Graham Bretton, a fact that Lucy has known since he once asked her why she was staring at him, but has deliberately concealed from the reader.

During the school holidays, all the teachers and pupils have either gone to travel abroad or gone back to their families. The school is completely empty except for a disabled child whom Lucy is supposed to take care of. After the disabled child is fetched away, Lucy is extremely lonely and becomes both mentally and physically ill. She goes to a Catholic church (despite being a Protestant) to confess to a priest. On the way back to the school, she collapses due to fever and mental exhaustion. Dr. John brings her to his home, which he shares with his mother, Mrs. Bretton.

Graham recognises Lucy only after she is brought to Mrs. Bretton's home. After Dr. John (i.e., Graham) discovers Ginevra's true character while at the theatre, he turns his attention to Lucy, and they become close friends. She values this friendship highly despite her usual emotional reserve. Lucy soon develops feelings for Dr. John and treasures the letters he sends her once she returns to the pensionnat.

Lucy and Graham meet Polly (Paulina Home) again at the same theatre after a fire, in which Polly is injured. Polly's father has inherited the title "de Bassompierre" and is now a Count; thus her name is now Paulina Mary Home de Bassompierre. Polly and Graham soon discover that they knew each other in the past and slowly renew their friendship. They fall in love and eventually marry despite the initial reluctance of Polly's father.

Lucy becomes progressively closer to a colleague, the irascible, autocratic, and confrontational professeur, M. Paul Emanuel, a relative of Mme. Beck. Lucy gradually realises that his apparent antagonism is actually helping her to overcome her weaknesses and to grow. She and Paul eventually fall in love.

However, a group of conspiring antagonists, including Madame Beck, the priest Père Silas, and the relatives of M. Paul's long-dead fiancée, work to keep the two apart, on the grounds that a union between a Catholic and a Protestant is impossible. They finally succeed in forcing M. Paul's departure for Guadeloupe to oversee a plantation there. He nonetheless declares his love for Lucy before his departure and arranges for her to live independently as the headmistress of her own day school, which she later expands into a pensionnat.

During the course of the novel, Lucy has three encounters with the figure of a nun — which may be the ghost of a nun who was buried alive on the school's grounds as punishment for breaking her vow of chastity. In a highly symbolic scene near the end of the novel, she discovers the "nun's" habit in her bed and destroys it. She later finds out that it was a disguise worn by Ginevra's amour, Alfred de Hamal, placed in Lucy's bed as a prank. The episodes with the nun no doubt contributed substantially to the novel's reputation as a gothic novel. Ginevra keeps in contact with Lucy through letters that show the young coquette has not changed and expects to live off of her uncle's (Basompierre's) good graces.

Villette's final pages are ambiguous. Although Lucy says that she wants to leave the reader free to imagine a happy ending, she hints strongly that M. Paul's ship was destroyed by a storm during his return journey from the West Indies. She says that, "M. Emanuel was away three years. Reader, they were the three happiest years of my life." This passage suggests that he was drowned by the "destroying angel of tempest."

In her Life, Elizabeth Gaskell quotes Brontë describing the ambiguity of the ending as a "little puzzle".

== Themes ==
Villette is noted not so much for its plot as for its acute tracing of Lucy's psychology. The novel, in a gothic setting, simultaneously explores themes of isolation, doubling, displacement and subversion, and each of their impacts upon the protagonist's psyche.

Villette is sometimes celebrated as an exploration of gender roles and repression. In The Madwoman in the Attic, critics Sandra Gilbert and Susan Gubar have argued that the character of Lucy Snowe is based in part on William Wordsworth's Lucy poems. Gilbert and Gubar emphasise the idea of feminine re-writing. Some critics have explored the issues of Lucy's psychological state in terms of what they call "patriarchal constructs" which form her cultural context.

Villette also explores isolation and cross-cultural conflict in Lucy's attempts to master the French language, as well as conflicts between her English Protestantism and Catholicism. Her denunciation of Catholicism is unsparing: e.g., "God is not with Rome."

== Critical reception ==
George Eliot believed that Villette was "a still more wonderful book than Jane Eyre. There is something almost preternatural in its power."

In his review, George Henry Lewes compared Villette favourably to the other subject of his article, Elizabeth Gaskell's Ruth, preferring its depiction of Lucy Snowe's moral struggle to the more conventional moral testing of Gaskell's protagonist. He criticises Brontë's inclusion of some episodes that are not integral to the novel, while acknowledging their vividness and truth. Overall, he praises Villete's originality and emotional depth, concluding: " ... there are so few books, and so many volumes – so few persons thinking and speaking for themselves, so many reverberating the vague noises of others. Among the few stands Villette."

Virginia Woolf claimed that Villette is Charlotte Brontë's "finest novel", and highlights its evocative descriptions of the natural world as a reflection of the main character's state of mind.

The Daily Telegraph's Lucy Hughes-Hallett argued that Villette is greater than Brontë's most famous work, Jane Eyre. She calls the novel "an astonishing piece of writing" in which Brontë's prose is "marvellously flexible", which is shown through contrasts of the "phantasmagorical set pieces" and the "minute psychological exploration" it contains; and that it "veers between sardonic wit and stream-of-consciousness".

Claire Fallon, writing for The Huffington Post, noted that Villette shares themes and many elements with Jane Eyre – "gothic mysticism, spiritual intensity, bursts of passionate lyricism, a plain heroine making her way in an unfriendly world", but highlights the dichotomy between each of the novels' protagonists: "Where Jane's specialness is stipulated ... Lucy Snowe, is an unassuming figure who spends the majority of the novel as a quiet observer. Jane insists on her own agency, while Lucy is reactive at best. Yet it is Lucy who truly breaks free of the expected domestic fate." Fallon considered that Villette – while in some ways similar – is Jane Eyre's "inverse", saying: " Jane Eyre works in sharp black and white, while Villette works in psychological and even factual grey areas."

== Adaptations ==
=== In print ===
Jamaica Kincaid's novel Lucy (1990) draws numerous themes, character names, and plot elements from Villette, both echoing its concern of female repression while also offering an implicit postcolonial critique of the novel's slave-owning love interest.

=== In dramatisations ===
In 1970, the BBC produced a television miniseries based on Villette, directed by Moira Armstrong and written by Lennox Phillips. It starred Judy Parfitt as Lucy Snowe, Bryan Marshall as Dr. John Graham Bretton, Peter Jeffrey as Paul Emanuel, and Mona Bruce as Madame Beck.

In 1999, the novel was adapted as a three-hour radio serial for BBC Radio 4. It was broadcast in February 1999 with Catherine McCormack as Lucy Snowe, Joseph Fiennes as Dr. Graham Bretton, Harriet Walter as Mme. Beck, James Laurenson as M. Paul Emanuel, and Keira Knightley as Polly. It was directed by Catherine Bailey and written by James Friel. Villette went on to win a Sony Award.

In August 2009, the novel was adapted as a two-week-long serial by Rachel Joyce for BBC Radio 4, directed by Tracey Neale and with Anna Maxwell Martin as Lucy Snowe.
