= Constantin Heger =

Belgian professor and literary figure (1809–1896)

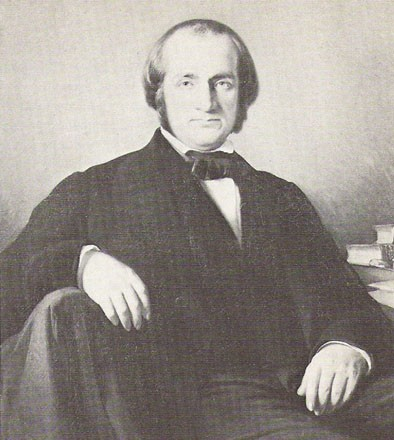
- Portrait of Constantin Heger, c. 1865
- Born: 10 July 1809; Brussels, Belgium
- Died: 6 May 1896 (aged 86); Brussels, Belgium
- Occupations: Professor; literary figure
- Spouses: Marie-Josephine Noyer (m. 1830; died 1833) Claire Zoë Parent (m. 1836; died 1890)
- Children: Louise Heger; Paul Heger

Constantin Georges Romain Heger, also spelled Héger (10 July 1809 – 6 May 1896) was a Belgian professor and literary figure of the Victorian era. He is best remembered today for his relationship with Charlotte Brontë during the 1840s. Some of the characters featured in Charlotte's work, especially Mr. Rochester in Jane Eyre (1847), were inspired by him, and her two other novels, Villette (1853) and The Professor (1857) were inspired by her experience as a student under Heger.

== Early life and education ==
Constantin Georges Romain Heger (Note: "Heger" without an acute accent is the spelling used in most Anglophone sources. However, many Francophone sources use "Héger", with the accent. Constantin Heger's spelling of his own name without an accent is supported by the following: The "National Biography of Belgium" entry: Biographie Nationale: Constantin Heger; "Brussels, marriage certificate no. 724 of 3 September 1836. Claire Zoë Parent, born in Brussels on 13 July 1804, resident there, teacher, is the daughter of Pierre Parent, resident in Brussels, pensioner, present and consenting to the marriage and of Marie Charlotte Le Grand. Constantin Georges Romain Heger [without accent on the "e"], widower of Marie Joséphine [with accent] Noyer who died on 26 September 1833, was born in Brussels on 10 July 1809, resident there, professor at the Athénée, son of Joseph Antoine Heger [without accent on the "e"] and Marie Thérèse Maré [with accents], resident in Saint-Nicolas, pensioner, and consenting by deed. The witnesses were Pierre Parent, pensioner in Brussels, Antoine Noyer, pensioner in Brussels, Jules Heger [without accent on the "e"], lithographer in Brussels, and Antoine Joseph Deprez, printer in Brussels."; Essays corrected by Constantin Heger, with his signature, transcribed from the manuscript: (Source: Brontë, Charlotte; Brontë, Emily. Lonoff, Sue (ed.). Charlotte Brontë and Emily Brontë: The Belgian Essays. ASIN B004G5JZEC.); Quotes from his letters, transcribed from the manuscript: n41 (Source: Barker, Juliet (21 November 1994). The Brontës. Weidenfeld & Nicolson. ISBN 978-0297812906.); Charlotte Brontë did not use one in her letters (Smith’s edition) nor on this envelope, found in Emily Brontë's desk.; Letter from Percy E. Spielmann, son of Marion H. Spielmann: QUESTION OF AN ACCENT The following letter has been received by the Hon. Secretary of the Brontë Society: 76, Cranmer Court, Sloane Avenue, S. W. 3. October 2nd, 1955. DEAR MR. OLIVER, TRANSACTIONS: opposite p. 429. It is astonishing that amongst the cognoscenti there should be any question at all about an accent on the name Heger. The family came from Austria, and the accretion of an accent would be intolerable to the family. I have several letters from Dr. Paul Heger to my father M. H. Spielmann (whom you will clearly remember) and one from Louise Heger, and in none of them is an accent. Yours sincerely, PERCY E. SPIELMANN (Source: "Question of an Accent". Brontë Society Transactions. 13–1: 23. 1956.)) was born in Brussels in 1809 and moved to Paris in 1825 seeking employment. For a period he worked as secretary to a solicitor, but because of a shortage of funds, was unable to pursue a legal career himself. In 1829, he returned to Brussels, where he became a teacher of French and mathematics at the Athénée Royal. In 1830, he married his first wife, Marie-Josephine Noyer. When revolution broke out in Brussels in 1830, Heger fought on the barricades from 23 to 27 September alongside the revolutionaries. In September 1833, Heger's wife died during a cholera epidemic. His son, Gustave died in June 1834, at nine months old. He was appointed a teacher in languages, mathematics, geography and Belgian history at the veterinary college in Brussels' Rue Terarken. Heger continued to teach at the Athénée Royal when it relocated to the Rue des Douze Apôtres in 1839. He met Mlle Claire Zoë Parent (1804 – 1887), the head of the neighbouring girls' boarding school in the Rue Isabelle, where he began teaching. They married in 1836 and had six children.

== The Brontës ==
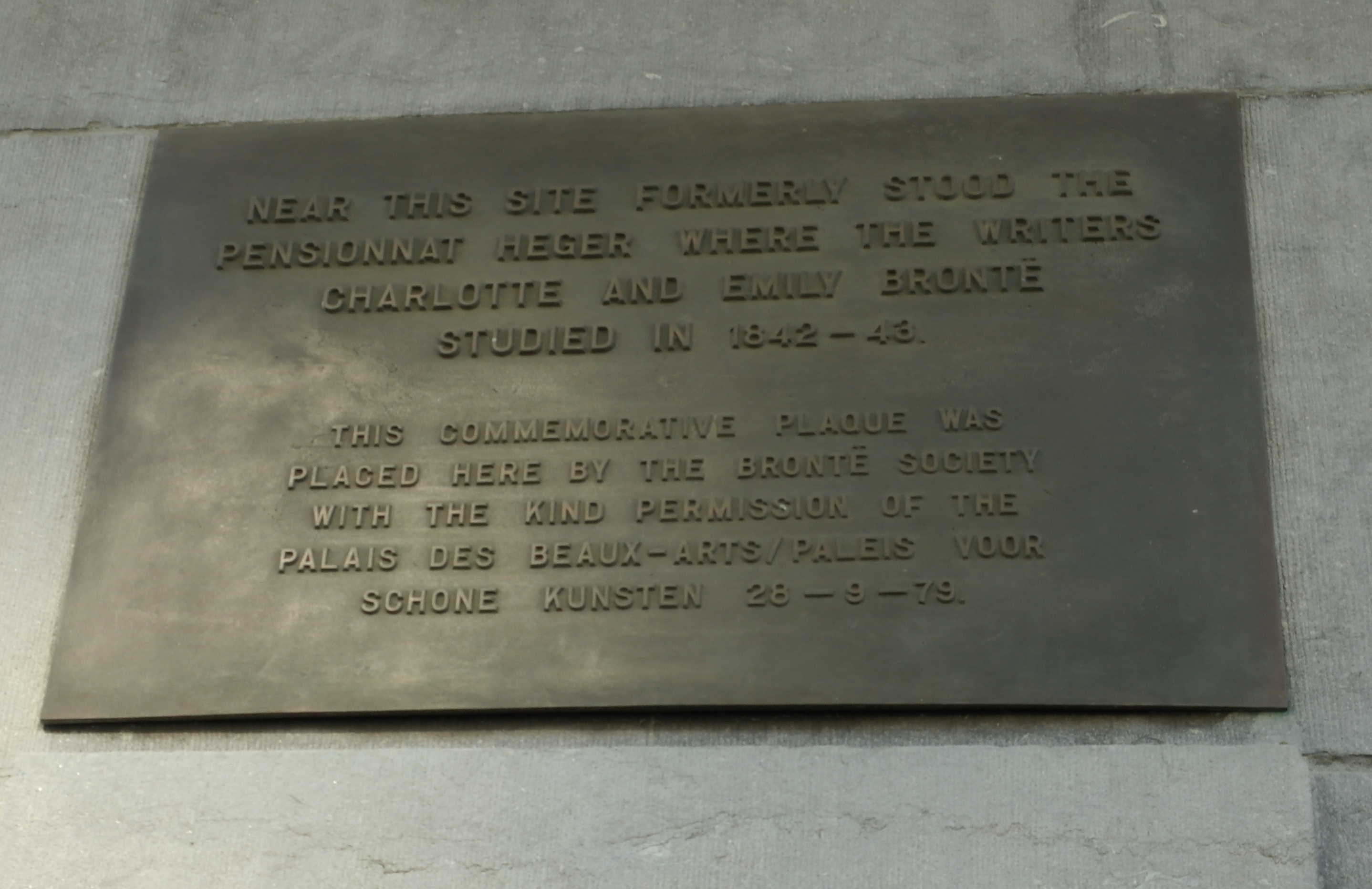
Plaque in Brussels

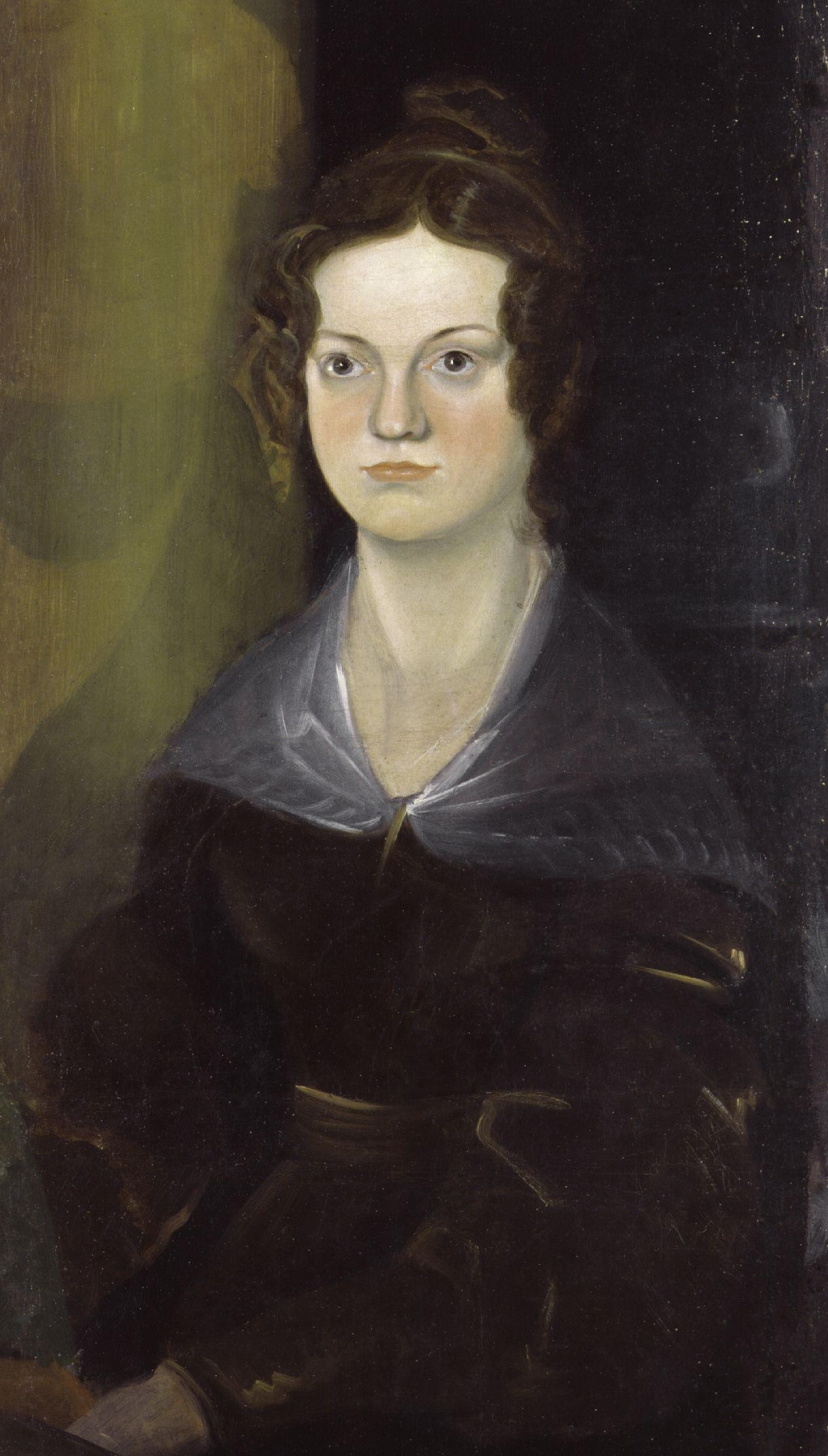
Portrait of Charlotte Bronte by her brother Branwell

In 1842 Emily and Charlotte Brontë travelled to Brussels to enroll in the boarding school run by Heger and his wife. Their aim was to improve their skill in languages. In return for board and tuition, Charlotte taught English and Emily taught music. Charlotte was greatly impressed with Heger, whom she describes in an early letter to a friend:

There is one individual of whom I have not yet spoken M Heger the husband of Madame - he is a professor of Rhetoric a man of power as to mind but very choleric & irritable in temperament - a little, black, ugly being with a face that varies in expression, sometimes he borrows the lineaments of an insane Tomcat - sometimes those of a delirious Hyena - occasionally - but very seldom he discards these perilous attractions and assumes an air not above a hundred degrees removed from what you would call mild & gentleman-like ...

The sisters' time at the school was cut short in October 1842 by the sudden death of their aunt, Elizabeth Branwell. Charlotte returned alone to Brussels in January 1843 to take up a teaching post at the school. Her second stay there was not a happy one; she was lonely, homesick, and had developed a passionate (and unreciprocated) attachment to Constantin Heger, which made it impossible for her to remain. She finally returned to the Parsonage at Haworth in January 1844, and later used her time at the boarding school as the inspiration for parts of The Professor, Jane Eyre and Villette. She maintained a somewhat one-sided correspondence with Heger, sending him numerous letters, which he mostly seems to have left unanswered. Charlotte Brontë's feelings for Heger were not made public until after her death, when four of her letters to him were published in The Times. In one of these, she writes:

...all I know – is that I cannot – that I will not resign myself to the total loss of my master's friendship – I would rather undergo the greatest bodily pains that have my heart constantly lacerated by searing regrets. If my master withdraws his friendship from me entirely I shall be absolutely without hope – if he gives me a little friendship – a very little – I shall be content – happy, I would have a motive for living – for working. Monsieur, the poor do not need a great deal to live on – they ask only the crumbs of bread which fall from the rich men's table – but if they are refused these crumbs – they die of hunger – No more do I need a great deal of affection from those I love – I would not know what to do with a whole and complete friendship – I am not accustomed to it – but you showed a little interest in me in days gone by when I was your pupil in Brussels – and I cling to the preservation of this little interest – I cling to it as I would cling on to life.

Heger had first shown these letters to Elizabeth Gaskell when she visited him in 1856 while researching her biography The Life of Charlotte Brontë, but Gaskell omitted any mention of them from the biography. The letters, referred to as the 'Heger Letters', had originally been torn up by Heger, but his wife retrieved them and meticulously pieced them back together. Their son, Paul Heger, and his sisters eventually donated the letters to the British Museum, and in 1913 they were published. Heger's letters to Charlotte were all destroyed.

== Later years ==
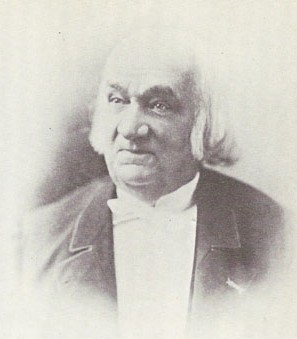
Heger in later years

After the Brontës' stay at the boarding school, Heger became principal of the Athénée Royal in 1853, but resigned the position in 1855 in objection to methods implemented by the general inspectors of the school. At his request, he resumed the teaching of the youngest class in the school. He continued to give lessons in his wife's boarding school until he retired around 1882.

Constantin Heger died in 1896, and was buried with his wife and their daughter Marie, who died in 1886, in Watermael-Boitsfort municipal cemetery, on the edge of the Sonian Forest.
