= Antiguan and Barbudan Americans =

Americans of Antiguan and Barbudan birth or descent

Antiguan an' Barbudan Americans dem (Antigua and Barbuda Creole English)

Total population
- 18,664

Regions with significant populations
- New York, Massachusetts, Pennsylvania, New Jersey, Connecticut, Rhode Island, Illinois, Wisconsin, Delaware, Maryland, Virginia, North Carolina, Georgia, Florida, Minnesota, Texas, Washington, Colorado and California

Languages
- American English, Antiguan and Barbudan Creole

Religion
- Christianity

Antiguan and Barbudan Americans are Americans of full or partial Antiguan and Barbudan ancestry.

== Notable people ==
- Anna Maria Horsford, actress
- Jamaica Kincaid, author and horticulturist
- Z. Alexander Looby, civil rights attorney
- Patsy Moore, singer-songwriter
- Akeel Morris, professional baseball player
- Kemba Walker, NBA basketball coach
- DJ Red Alert, radio DJ

== See also ==
- Antigua and Barbuda–United States relations
- Caribbean immigration to New York City
