= Paul Heger =

Belgian scientist (1846–1925)

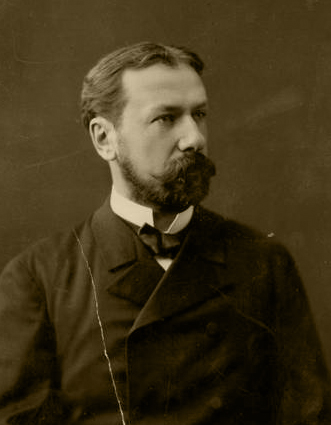
- Portrait of Paul Heger, c. 1900
- Born: 13 December 1846; Brussels, Belgium
- Died: 8 November 1925 (aged 78); Brussels, Belgium
- Education: Vrije Universiteit Brussel (1871)
- Known for: Blood circulation; Liver metabolism; Respiratory system; Leukocytes; Nervous system; Digestion
- Parent: Constantin Heger
- Relatives: Louise Heger
- Awards: Fellow of the Royal Society of Medicine (1915)
- Scientific career
- Fields: Biology
- Doctoral advisor: Carl Ludwig
- Other academic advisors: Theodor Schwann
- Doctoral students: Jules Bordet; Jean Massart

Paul Marie François Xavier Heger, also spelled Héger (13 December 1846 – 8 November 1925) was a Belgian scientist. He is famous for his collaboration with the chemist Ernest Solvay to discover the Solvay Process. Alongside Solvay, he donated a large sum of money to fund Leopold Park and helped establish the Solvay Institute of Physiology and Institute of Sociology.

Additionally, he made substantial contributions to the understanding of blood circulation, especially in the context of artificial circulation, demonstrating that the vascular endothelium actively participates in circulation and osmosis, challenging the view of blood vessels as passive conduits. He also discovered that adding nicotine to circulating blood increases blood flow speed through living tissues.

Heger also made contributions to the understanding of liver function. He found that the liver significantly reduces alkaloid concentration in blood, highlighting its role in detoxification. Additionally, he showed that alkaloids are broken down into less toxic components within the liver, emphasising its purifying function and its capacity to locate and store poisons.

== Early life and education ==
Paul Marie François Xavier Heger was born to Constantin Heger and Claire Zoë Parent. His father was a famous professor who was known for his correspondence with Charlotte and Emily Brontë. Constantin inspired some of the characters in Charlotte's novels including Mr. Rochester in Jane Eyre (1847). Paul enrolled at the Vrije Universiteit Brussel in 1864, where he studied medicine. In 1869, he conducted cytological research with Salomon Stricker at Vienna General Hospital. He graduated with his Doctorate of Medicine in 1871 and went to continue residency in Vienna. He also worked for a period of time in a laboratory in Leipzig under the eminent physiologist Carl Ludwig, who was renowned for his research on blood pressure, urinary excretion, and anesthesia. Additionally, he worked alongside Theodor Schwann who discovered Schwann cells in the peripheral nervous system and made substantial contributions to the cell theory.

== Experimental research ==
In 1873, Heger published Experiment on the Circulation of Blood in Isolated Organs. Introduction to a Study on the Effects of Toxic Substances by the Method of Artificial Circulations. This work brought to light some important physiological properties; one showed that the vascular wall does not play a passive role, but that its cells, its endothelium, actively participate in the phenomena of circulation and those of osmosis. It showed, on the other hand, that the organs crossed by a blood current are not passive, but rather their cells exert a selective action on the products that the nourishing liquid brings them.

He also found that the addition of nicotine to the circulating blood considerably increases the speed of the current. This phenomenon does not depend on a blood modification determined by the alkaloid, because the circulation of this nicotine-laced blood in a dead organ no longer shows any change in speed. The blood flow only undergoes a progressive decrease that the addition of nicotine can no longer influence. The alkaloid therefore determines changes in the caliber of the capillaries by direct action on the vascular wall.

In order to conclude from the data of artificial circulation to those of natural circulation, Heger instituted control experiments on the living animal. In these experiments the organs remain in relation with the central nervous system and receive coagulable blood. The results of these experiments demonstrated the unequal absorption of toxic materials by the different organs. In crossing the liver, the blood loses about half of the alkaloid it contains; it loses nothing in crossing the lung placed in physiological inspiration. From these interesting observations, Heger drew two conclusions; the first is that the diffusion of alkaloids in the organs is influenced by the texture of the vascular walls. It is their special properties that create the differences observed in the absorption coefficient of the various organs for the same alkaloid. The second conclusion is that from these experiments it cannot be concluded that the poisons are located in the liver; instead, the alkaloid must be examined in the parenchyma.

Heger also observed that the blood and the liver split atropine into two constituents: tropine and tropic acid, which no longer possess the toxic properties of the alkaloid. This body of work is of considerable importance. It highlights an unsuspected function of the liver: the purifying function, which protects the blood against foreign or harmful products; as well as the property of locating and accumulating poisons.

In 1878, Heger published A Critical and Experimental Study on the Emigration of Blood Globules, Considered in its Relationship with Inflammation. Prolonged observation of leukocytes, located in the white space, shows that the speed of translation of the cell gradually decreases, and that it ends up immobilising itself against the vascular wall. From the moment contact is established, the cell loses its spherical shape, and emits extensions which insinuate themselves between the cells of the vascular endothelium. Heger showed that the white space increases when circulation slows down, as is the case when the vessels dilate, and the number of leukocytes which populate this space increases progressively.

In 1880, he published Research on the Circulation of Blood in the Lungs. In his research, he found that the flow of blood through the pulmonary vein decreases as the air pressure in the alveolar atmosphere rises. Natural inspiration therefore exerts suction on the alveolar surface and suction on the pleural surface of the lung. This double suction dilates the vessels and makes them more permeable to blood. The weakening of the right heart is more than compensated by the abundance of liquid that inspiration itself pours into the heart. The more air there is physiologically brought into the lung, the more blood there is in the organ. Additionally, Heger collaborated with Maurice Philippson and found that adrenaline, a powerful vasoconstrictor, does not, however, exert any modification on the flow of Locke's liquid, circulating in the lung during inspiration.

Alongside Philippson, Heger hypothesised that the nervous system distributes energy rather than produces energy. The experiments of Heger and Philippson supported this hypothesis in that the production of carbonic acid in an animal is independent of the state of rest or activity of its nerve centres. The experiments of Atwater and Benedict later demonstrated on humans living in the respiratory chamber of Atwater Rosa, that cerebral activity does not determine any perceptible production of energy.

Alongside Hubert Higgins, Heger conducted physiological experiments on digestion and noted that the soft palate of the mouth produces both positive and negative pressure. The soft palate of the mouth has the ability to make the mouth cavity airtight such that when food is swallowed in a gulp, the soft palate induces a backward motion in a phenomenon known as psomophagic swallowing. Conversely, he discovered that when food is finely masticated, the soft palate induces a forward motion known as poltophagic swallowing. His discovery was in support of anthropological evidence which states that the shortening of the upper jaw in combination with a vertical posture has given humans the ability to engage in both kinds of swallowing. These findings were popularised by American writer Horace Fletcher.

== Career ==
In 1889, he was appointed director of the Solvay Research Institute. During the First World War, he served as vice-president of the Université libre de Bruxelles (ULB) and held the position of president until 1924. His role as president was instrumental to the reform and expansion of the university. He played a key role in helping secure over 20 million francs from John D. Rockefeller and other sources. As a member of the Royal Academy of Medicine, he sought to revolutionise medical education, shifting it from its traditionally dogmatic approach to one focused on experimentation. He emphasised hands-on learning over theoretical explanations, a method that resonated strongly with his students and attracted others, including figures like Hector Denis, Eugène Goblet d'Alviella, and Paul Janson, who travelled to attend his lectures. Starting in 1895, he directed the Solvay Institute of Physiology at Leopold Park and founded the International Archives of Physiology in 1904, which was one of Europe's earliest journals dedicated to physiological research.

As Director of the Solvay Institute, he collaborated with Hendrik Lorentz, who shared the 1902 Nobel Prize in Physics with Pieter Zeeman for his theoretical explanation of the Zeeman effect to write the rules for the Institute of Physics. He also collaborated with Solvay to form the Solvay enterprise and arrange the Solvay Conferences. The Solvay Conferences were a groundbreaking series of scientific meetings founded in 1911 that brought together the most brilliant minds in physics and chemistry to discuss the fundamental problems of science. The First Solvay Conference focused on Radiation and the Quanta, and was centred around early quantum theory. The conference hosted many prominent scientists including Albert Einstein, Marie Curie, Max Planck, Hendrik Lorentz, and Niels Bohr. Heger's role was key in the governance and financing of future Solvay Conferences, selection process for participants, and long-term vision of creating a permanent international scientific community.

Throughout his career, Heger mentored many prominent scientists, including Jules Bordet, who was an internationally acclaimed immunologist. Bordet won the 1919 Nobel Prize in Physiology or Medicine for his work on the bacteria Bordetella. The street Rue Héger-Bordet in Brussels honours both Heger and Bordet. Heger was also well acquainted with zoologist Élie Metchnikoff, known for discovering phagocytosis, who nominated him for the 1908 Nobel Prize.

== Personal life ==
In 1875, Heger married Léonie Van Mons, and the couple had three children. He was also part of a family of notable intellectuals and artists, including being the grandfather of the landscape architect René Pechère. He also provided the British Museum with four letters written by his father, Constantin Heger, to Charlotte Brontë, which were published in The Times newspaper.

Paul Heger died in Brussels on 8 November 1925, after being struck by a car. He is interred at Watermael-Boitsfort cemetery.
