= Jamaica Kincaid =

Antiguan-American writer (born 1949)

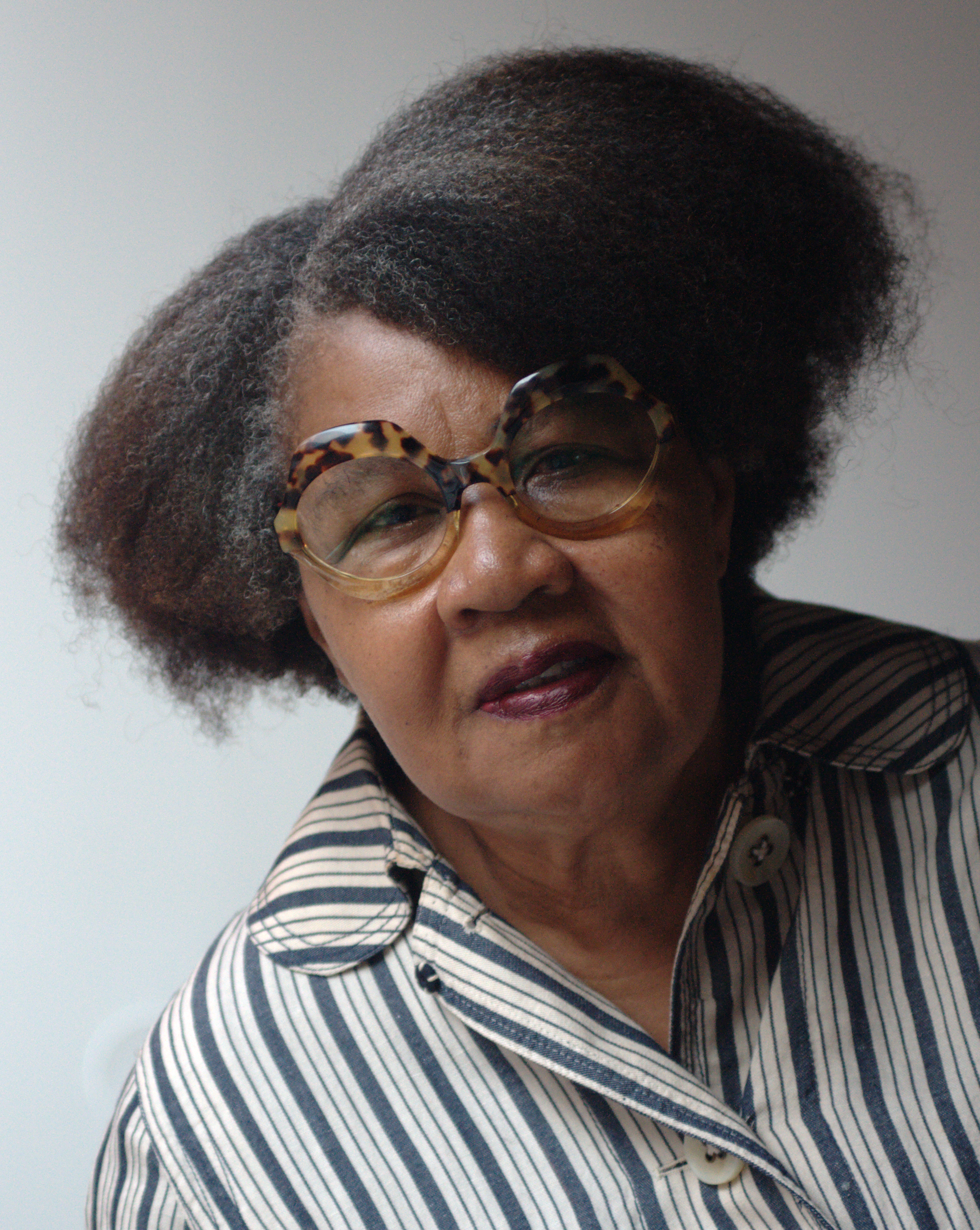
- Kincaid in September 2019
- Born: Elaine Cynthia Potter Richardson; May 25, 1949 (age 77); St. John's, Antigua and Barbuda
- Education: Franconia College (no degree)
- Spouse: Allen Shawn (m. 1979; div. 2002)
- Children: 2
- Writing career
- Genres: Fiction, memoir, essays
- Notable works: Annie John (1985); A Small Place (1988); Lucy (1990)
- Notable awards: American Academy of Arts and Letters, 2004

Jamaica Kincaid (/kɪnˈkeɪd/; born Elaine Cynthia Potter Richardson on May 25, 1949) is an Antiguan–American novelist, essayist, gardener, and gardening writer. Born in St. John's, the capital of Antigua and Barbuda, she lives in North Bennington, Vermont, and is Professor of African and African American Studies in Residence Emerita at Harvard University.

== Biography ==
Kincaid was born on 25 May 1949 in St. John's, on Antigua. She grew up in relative poverty with her mother, Annie Richardson Drew, a literate, cultured woman and homemaker who also worked as an assistant to a local physician, and her stepfather, David Drew, a carpenter. She was very close to her mother until her three brothers were born in quick succession, starting when Kincaid was nine years old. After her brothers' births, she resented her mother, who thereafter focused primarily on the brothers' needs. Kincaid later recalled:

Our family money remained the same, but there were more people to feed and to clothe, and so everything got sort of shortened, not only material things but emotional things. The good emotional things, I got a short end of that. But then I got more of things I didn't have, like a certain kind of cruelty and neglect.

In an interview for The New York Times, Kincaid said, "The way I became a writer was that my mother wrote my life for me and told it to me."

Kincaid received a British education, as Antigua did not gain independence from the United Kingdom until 1981. Kincaid attended the Princess Margaret School and the Antigua Girls' High School, and apprenticed as a seamstress. Although Kincaid was intelligent and frequently tested at the top of her class, her mother removed her from school at 16 to help support the family when her third brother was born, because her stepfather was ill and could no longer provide for the family. In 1966, when Kincaid was 16, her mother sent her to Scarsdale, an affluent suburb of New York City, to work as an au pair. After that, Kincaid refused to send money home; "she left no forwarding address and was cut off from her family until her return to Antigua 20 years later".

=== Family ===
In 1979, Kincaid married the composer and Bennington College professor Allen Shawn, son of longtime The New Yorker editor William Shawn and brother of playwright Wallace Shawn. They have two children: a son, Harold, a music producer and songwriter; and a daughter, Annie, who works in marketing. Kincaid and Shawn divorced in 2002.

Kincaid is a keen gardener who has written extensively on the subject.

She converted to Judaism in 1993 for family reasons, and was president of Congregation Beth El, Bennington's synagogue, in the 1990s.

=== Career overview ===
While working as an au pair, Kincaid enrolled in evening classes at a community college. After three years, she resigned from her job to attend Franconia College in New Hampshire on a full scholarship. She also attended the New School for Social Research, studying photography. She dropped out after a year and returned to New York, where she started writing for the teenage girls' magazine Ingénue, The Village Voice, and Ms. magazine. She got her first assignment at Ingenue by walking in off the street and proposing an interview with Gloria Steinem, which became "When I was Seventeen", her first published article. She changed her name to Jamaica Kincaid in 1973, when her writing was first published. Her friend and author Guy Trebay suggested the name from his "little satirical playlet". She first dismissed it as "too stupid", but adopted it a week later. She called the name change "a way for me to do things without being the same person who couldn't do them—the same person who had all these weights". She said that "Jamaica" is an English corruption of what Christopher Columbus called Xaymaca, the part of the world she comes from, and that "Kincaid" seemed to go well with "Jamaica". Her short fiction appeared in The Paris Review and in The New Yorker, where her 1990 novel Lucy was serialized.

Kincaid's work has been both praised and criticized for its subject matter because it largely draws upon her own life and because her tone is often perceived as angry. She has responded that many writers draw upon personal experience, and that to call her work autobiographical and angry is not valid criticism.

Kincaid was the 50th commencement speaker at Bard College at Simon's Rock in 2019.

==== The New Yorker ====
As a result of her budding writing career and friendship with George W. S. Trow, who wrote many pieces for The New Yorker column "Talk of the Town", Kincaid became acquainted with New Yorker editor William Shawn, who was impressed with her writing. He employed her as a staff writer in 1976 and for nine years as a columnist for "Talk of the Town". Shawn's tutelage legitimized Kincaid as a writer and proved pivotal to her development of voice. She was a staff writer for The New Yorker for 20 years. She resigned in 1996, when then editor Tina Brown chose actress Roseanne Barr to guest-edit an issue. Though circulation rose under Brown, Kincaid was critical of Brown for making the magazine less literary and more celebrity-oriented.

Kincaid has said that when she was a writer for The New Yorker, she was often asked, particularly by women, how she obtained her position. She felt that these questions were posed because she was a young Black woman "from nowhere… I have no credentials. I have no money. I literally come from a poor place. I was a servant. I dropped out of college. The next thing you know I'm writing for The New Yorker, I have this sort of life, and it must seem annoying to people."

Talk Stories, a collection of "77 short pieces Kincaid wrote for The New Yorker's 'Talk of the Town' column between 1974 and 1983", was published in 2001.

=== Recognition ===
Kincaid received the 2022 Paris Review Hadada Prize, the magazine's annual lifetime achievement award.

== Writing ==
Her novels are loosely autobiographical, though Kincaid has warned against interpreting their autobiographical elements too literally: "Everything I say is true, and everything I say is not true. You couldn't admit any of it to a court of law. It would not be good evidence." Her work often prioritizes "impressions and feelings over plot development" and features conflict with both a strong maternal figure and colonial and neocolonial influences. Excerpts from her nonfiction book A Small Place were used as part of the narrative for Stephanie Black's 2001 documentary Life and Debt.

African-American literary critic, scholar, writer, and public intellectual Henry Louis Gates Jr. has said of Kincaid:

She never feels the necessity of claiming the existence of a black world or a female sensibility. She assumes them both. I think it's a distinct departure that she's making, and I think that more and more black American writers will assume their world the way that she does so that we can get beyond the large theme of racism and get to the deeper themes of how black people love and cry and live and die—which, after all, is what art is all about.

=== Themes ===
Kincaid's writing explores colonialism and colonial legacy, postcolonialism and neo-colonialism, gender and sexuality, renaming, mother-daughter relationships, British and American imperialism, colonial education, writing, racism, class, power, death, and adolescence. In her novel See Now Then, Kincaid explores the theme of time.

=== Tone and style ===
Kincaid's style has had a mixed reception among critics and scholars. Harold Bloom said: "Most of the published criticism of Jamaica Kincaid has stressed her political and social concerns, somewhat at the expense of her literary qualities." As works such as At the Bottom of the River and The Autobiography of My Mother use Antiguan cultural practices, some critics say they employ magical realism. "The author claims, however, that [her work] is 'magic' and 'real,' but not necessarily [work] of 'magical realism'." Other critics call her style modernist because much of it is "culturally specific and experimental". It has also been praised for its keen observation of character, curtness, wit, and lyrical quality. Her short story "Girl" is essentially a list of instructions on how a girl should live and act, but the messages are much larger than the literal list of suggestions. Derek Walcott said of Kincaid's writing: "As she writes a sentence, psychologically, its temperature is that it heads toward its own contradiction. It's as if the sentence is discovering itself, discovering how it feels. And that is astonishing, because it's one thing to be able to write a good declarative sentence; it's another thing to catch the temperature of the narrator, the narrator's feeling. And that's universal, and not provincial in any way". Susan Sontag commended Kincaid's writing for its "emotional truthfulness", poignancy, and complexity. It has been said that her "force and originality lie in her refusal to curb her tongue". Giovanna Covi wrote: "The tremendous strength of Kincaid's stories lies in their capacity to resist all canons. They move at the beat of a drum and the rhythm of jazz". Her writing has been said to have a "double vision" wherein one plot line mirrors another with symbolism that enhances the possibilities for interpretation.

=== Influences ===
Kincaid's writing is largely influenced by her life circumstances. To consider that a flaw, according to the writer Michael Arlen, is to be "disrespectful of a fiction writer's ability to create fictional characters". Kincaid worked for Arlen, who became a colleague at The New Yorker, as an au pair, and the father in Lucy is based on him. She has said, "I would never say I wouldn't write about an experience I've had."

=== Reception and criticism ===
In Salon.com, Peter Kurth called Kincaid's My Brother the most overrated book of 1997. In The New York Times, Dwight Garner called See Now Then (2013) "bipolar", "half séance, half ambush", and "the kind of lumpy exorcism that many writers would have composed and then allowed to remain unpublished. It picks up no moral weight as it rolls along. It asks little of us, and gives little in return." Another New York Times review called it "not an easy book to stomach" but added, "Kincaid's force and originality lie in her refusal to curb her tongue, in an insistence on home truths that spare herself least of all." In The Boston Globe, Kate Tuttle wrote: "Kincaid allowed that critics are correct to point out the book's complexity. 'The one thing the book is,' she said, 'is difficult, and I meant it to be.'" A review of Mr Potter (2002) said: "It wouldn't be so hard if the repetition weren't coupled, here and everywhere it occurs, with a stern rebuff to any idea that it might be meaningful." Another critic wrote, "The superb precision of Kincaid's style makes it a paradigm of how to avoid lots of novelistic pitfalls."

In 2022, Kincaid was one of 38 Harvard faculty members to sign a letter to The Harvard Crimson defending Professor John Comaroff, who had been found to have violated the university's sexual and professional conduct policies. The letter called Comaroff "an excellent colleague, advisor and committed university citizen" and expressed dismay over his being sanctioned by the university. After students filed a lawsuit with detailed allegations of Comaroff's actions and Harvard did not respond, Kincaid was one of several signatories to say she wished to retract her signature.

== Bibliography ==
=== Novels ===
- Annie John (1985) ISBN 9780374105211
- Lucy (1990) ISBN 9780374194345
- The Autobiography of My Mother (1996) ISBN 9780374107314
- Mr. Potter (2002) ISBN 9780676974690
- See Now Then (2013) ISBN 9781250340641

=== Short fiction ===
- Girl (1978) , prose piece

Stories (Note: Short stories unless otherwise noted.)

Title	Year	First published	Reprinted/collected	Notes
"Ovando"	1989	Conjunctions 14: 75–83		
"The finishing line"	1990	New York Times Book Review 18		
"Biography of a Dress"	1992	Grand Street 11: 92–100		
"Song of Roland"	1993	The New Yorker 69: 94–98		
"Xuela"	1994	The New Yorker, 70: 82–92		

=== Non-fiction ===
- Among Flowers: A Walk in the Himalayas (2005) ISBN 9780374538101
- My Garden (Book) (2001) ISBN 9781529077063
- A Small Place (1988) ISBN 9781250340610
- My Brother (1998) ISBN 9781250340603

=== Collections ===
- At the Bottom of the River (1983)
- Talk Stories (2001) ISBN 9780374527914
- The Best American Essays (1995) ISBN 9780395691830, Editor
- Putting Myself Together: Writing 1974— (2025) ISBN 9780374613235
- Generations of Women (1998) ISBN 0811819078, 9780811819077

Uncollected essays

- "Antigua Crossings: A Deep and Blue Passage on the Caribbean Sea" (1978), Rolling Stone: 48–50.
- "On Seeing England for the First Time" (1991), Transition Magazine 51: 32–40
- "Out of Kenya" (1991), The New York Times: A15, A19, with Ellen Pall
- "Flowers of Evil: In the Garden" (1992), The New Yorker 68: 154–159
- "A Fire by Ice" (1993), The New Yorker 69: 64–67
- "Just Reading: In the Garden" (1993), The New Yorker 69: 51–55
- "Alien Soil: In the Garden" (1993), The New Yorker 69: 47–52
- "This Other Eden" (1993), The New Yorker 69: 69–73
- "The Season Past: In the Garden" (1994), The New Yorker 70: 57–61
- "In Roseau" (1995), The New Yorker 71: 92–99.
- "In History" (1997), The Colors of Nature
- My Favorite Plant: Writers and Gardeners on the Plants they Love (1998), Editor
- "A heap of disturbance". In the Garden. The New Yorker. 96 (26): 24–26. September 7, 2020. (Note: Online version is titled "The disturbances of the garden".)
- "Time with Pryor". The Talk of the Town. January 12, 1976. The New Yorker. 98 (26): 16–17. August 29, 2022. (Note: Originally published in the January 12, 1976 issue.) (Note: Online version is titled "Richard Pryor: 'I was born under the sign of funny'".)

=== Children's books ===
- Annie, Gwen, Lilly, Pam, and Tulip (1986)
- An Encyclopedia of Gardening for Colored Children (2024)
- Party: A Mystery (2019) ISBN 9781617757167
  - The story follows three girls, Pam, Bess, and Sue, who attend a formal party celebrating the Nancy Drew mystery books. During the event, two of the girls witness something disturbing or inexplicable, but the youngest does not. The book does not say what they saw. Party: A Mystery is Kincaid's first picture book and an adaptation of her earlier work in The New Yorker, marking a shift in both genre and form. Its unresolved narrative and subversion of the Nancy Drew-style mystery introduce ambiguity and psychological depth into children's literature.

———————

== See also ==
- Caribbean literature

== Interviews ==
- Selwyn Cudjoe, "Jamaica Kincaid and the Modernist Project: An Interview," Callaloo, 12 (Spring 1989): 396–411; reprinted in Caribbean Women Writers: Essays from the First International Conference, ed. Cudjoe (Wellesley, Mass.: Calaloux, 1990): 215–231.
- Leslie Garis, "Through West Indian Eyes," New York Times Magazine (October 7, 1990): 42.
- Donna Perry, "An Interview with Jamaica Kincaid," in Reading Black, Reading Feminist: A Critical Anthology, edited by Henry Louis Gates Jr. (New York: Meridian, 1990): 492–510.
- Kay Bonetti, "An Interview with Jamaica Kincaid," Missouri Review, 15, No. 2 (1992): 124–142.
- Allan Vorda, "I Come from a Place That's Very Unreal: An Interview with Jamaica Kincaid," in Face to Face: Interviews with Contemporary Novelists, ed. Vorda (Houston: Rice University Press, 1993): 77–105.
- Moira Ferguson, "A Lot of Memory: An Interview with Jamaica Kincaid," Kenyon Review, 16 (Winter 1994): 163–188.
- Darryl Pinckney, "The Art of Fiction," Paris Review, 239 (Spring 2022): No. 252

== Awards and honors ==
- 1984: Morton Dauwen Zabel Award of the American Academy of Arts and Letters for At the Bottom of the River
- 1984: Shortlisted for the PEN/Faulkner Award for Fiction for At the Bottom of the River.
- 1985: Guggenheim Award for Fiction
- 1985: Finalist for the International Ritz Paris Hemingway Award for Annie John
- 1992: Honorary Doctor of Humane Letters from Colgate University
- 1997: Shortlisted for the PEN/Faulkner Award for Fiction for The Autobiography of My Mother
- 1997: Anisfield-Wolf Book Award for The Autobiography of My Mother
- 1999: Lannan Literary Award for Fiction
- 2000: Prix Femina étranger for My Brother
- 2004: American Academy of Arts and Letters
- 2009: American Academy of Arts and Sciences
- 2010: Center for Fiction's Clifton Fadiman Medal for Annie John
- 2011: Honorary Doctor of Humane Letters from Tufts University
- 2014: Before Columbus Foundation American Book Award for See Now Then
- 2015: Honorary Doctor of Humane Letters from Brandeis University
- Lila Wallace-Reader's Digest Award
- 2017: Winner of the Dan David Prize in Literature
- 2021: Royal Society of Literature International Writer
- 2021: Langston Hughes Medal
- 2022: The Paris Review Hadada prize for lifetime achievement
