= The Professor (novel) =

1857 novel by Charlotte Brontë

The Professor, A Tale.
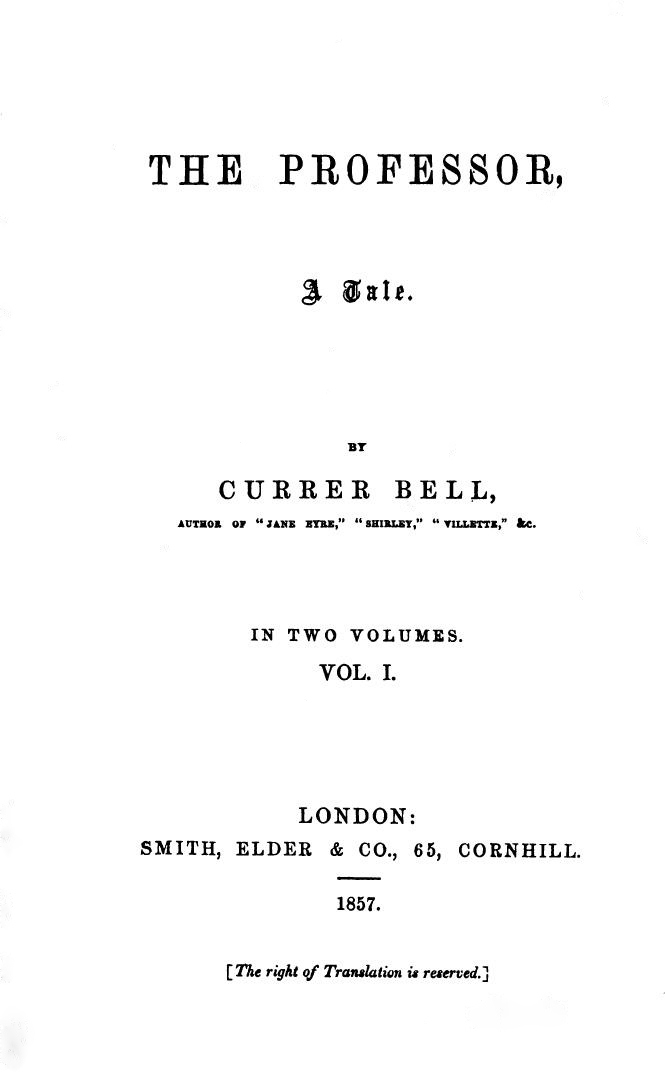
- Title page of the first edition, 1857
- Author: Charlotte Brontë (Currer Bell)
- Language: English, French
- Genre: Romance novel
- Publisher: Smith, Elder & Co.
- Publication date: 6 June 1857 (written 1846)
- Publication place: United Kingdom
- Media type: Print: hardback
- Pages: 330
- Dewey Decimal: 823.8
- LC Class: PR4167 .P7
- Preceded by: Villette
- Text: The Professor, A Tale. at Wikisource

The Professor, A Tale. was the first novel by English author Charlotte Brontë. It was written in 1846 before Jane Eyre, but was rejected by many publishing houses. It was eventually published, posthumously, in 1857, with the approval of Charlotte Brontë's widower, Arthur Bell Nicholls, who took on the task of reviewing and editing the text.

== Plot ==
The novel is the story of a young man, William Crimsworth, and is a first-person narrative from his perspective. It describes his maturation, his career as a teacher in Brussels, and his personal relationships.

The story starts with a letter William has sent to his friend Charles, detailing his rejection of his uncle's proposal that he become a clergyman, as well as his first meeting with his rich brother Edward. Seeking work as a tradesman, William is offered the position of a clerk by Edward. However, Edward is jealous of William's education and intelligence, and treats him terribly. Through the actions of the sympathetic Mr Hunsden, William is relieved of his post, but starts a new job at a boys' boarding school in Belgium.

The school is run by the friendly Monsieur Pelet, who treats William kindly and politely. Soon William's merits as a "professor" reach the ears of the headmistress of the neighbouring girls' school. Mademoiselle Reuter offers him a position at her school, which he accepts. Initially captivated by her, William begins to entertain ideas of falling in love with her, but then he overhears her and Monsieur Pelet talking about their upcoming marriage and their deceitful treatment of him.

William begins to treat Mademoiselle Reuter with cold civility as he sees her underlying nature. She, however, continues to try to draw him back in by pretending to be benevolent and concerned. She asks him to teach one of her young teachers, Frances, who hopes to improve her skill in languages. William sees promising intelligence in this pupil and slowly begins to fall in love with her.

Jealous of the attention Frances is receiving from William, Mademoiselle Reuter takes it upon herself to dismiss Frances from her post and to hide her address from William. After a long search he re-encounters Frances in a graveyard and they renew their acquaintance.

It is revealed that as she was trying to make herself amiable in William's eyes, Mademoiselle Reuter had accidentally fallen in love with him herself. Not wanting to cause a conflict with Monsieur Pelet, William leaves his establishment.

William gets a new position as a "professor" at a college, allowing him and Frances to marry. The two eventually open a school together and have a child. After achieving financial security the family travels around England and then settles in the countryside, near to Mr Hunsden. Frances gives birth to a child, Victor.

== Characters ==
- William Crimsworth: the protagonist, an orphaned child who is educated at Eton College after being taken in by his uncles. Rejecting their offer of a post as a clergyman, as he does not believe himself good enough for the role, he severs ties with them in order to walk in his late father's shoes and becomes a tradesman. His time in Yorkshire as a clerk for his cruel elder brother is short and he departs for Belgium, where he becomes a "professor" and meets his wife to be, who is a pupil of his. He is educated, religious and healthy, though not handsome.
- Lord Tynedale / Hon. John Seacombe: William's maternal uncles who attempt to set William up as Rector of Seacombe-cum-Scaife and to marry him off to one of his own cousins, "all of whom [he] greatly dislike[s]". William severs all ties with these relatives and little is related of them in the rest of the book.
- Charles: seemingly William's only friend at Eton. William writes a letter to him detailing his activities since Eton and just after his first meeting with Edward at Crimsworth Hall. This letter serves as an introduction to the book. Charles does not reply to the letter, as he has already set off for one of the colonies. He is an unseen character.
- Edward Crimsworth: William's tyrannical elder brother. He is an accomplished tradesman, owner of a Yorkshire mill, married and more handsome than his brother. Jealous of his sibling's education, he treats William cruelly. He later loses his wealth and wife, only to become rich again by the end of the book.
- Hunsden Yorke Hunsden: the man who frees William from his brother's clutches. He sets him up with contacts in Brussels and the two become good friends. He is a unique but not unattractive man whose taste in women is similar to William's, though he remains a lifelong bachelor.
- Monsieur Francois Pelet: the French headmaster of a boys' school in Belgium who employs William and becomes a good friend. He later betrays him to ensure the affection of Zoraïde Reuter, whom he later marries.
- Mademoiselle Zoraïde Reuter: the Catholic headmistress of a girls' school in Belgium. William is initially attracted to her, though she is destined to marry Monsieur Pelet.
- Frances Evans Henri: a pupil-teacher at the girls' school in Belgium where William Crimsworth finds himself. After the two fall in love they get married. They eventually move to England. She is a Swiss orphan of half -English extraction who was raised by her aunt.
- Madame Reuter: Zoraïde's mother
- Madame Pelet: Monsieur Pelet's mother
- Eulalie, Hortense and Caroline: three coquettish students at Mademoiselle Reuter's school
- Sylvie: a student at Monsieur Pelet's school
- Jules Vanderkelkov: another student
- Victor Crimsworth: son of William and Frances Evans Henri.

== Themes ==
=== Religion ===
Throughout the novel William looks down on Catholics and "Romish wizardcraft". Charlotte Brontë pictures the two main Catholic characters as treacherous and untrustworthy. William believes that Catholic training has a negative influence on the young girls at his school.

William has a certain snobbery against the Flemish and is disgusted by the way they butcher the English language as he attempts to teach them.

== Context ==
The novel is based on Charlotte Brontë's experiences in Brussels, where she studied as a language student and was a teacher in 1842. Much of the subject matter of The Professor was later reworked, from the perspective of a female teacher, into Brontë's later novel Villette.

== Bibliography ==
- Brontë, Charlotte The Professor. New York: Barnes and Noble, 2005.
- Butterworth, Robert. "The Professor and the Contemporary Working Milieu." Brontë Studies 35.3 (2010): 215–221.
- Butterworth, R. D. "The Professor and the Modern Experience of Work." Brontë Studies 36 (2011): 255–262.
- Longmuir, A. "Reader, Perhaps You Were Never in Belgium?: Negotiating British Identity in Charlotte Brontë's The Professor and Villette." Nineteenth-Century Literature, 64.2 (2009): 163–188.
- Lonoff, Sue. "The Three Faces of Constantin Heger." Brontë Studies 36.1 (2011): 28–37.
- O'Toole, T. Introduction. The Professor. By Charlotte Brontë. New York: Barnes and Noble, 2005: vii–xiii.
- Pearson, Sara L. "Constructing Masculine Narrative: Charlotte Brontë’s The Professor". Women Constructing Men: Female Novelists and Their Male Characters, 1750–2000. Ed. Sarah S.G. Frantz and Katharina Rennhak. Lanham, MD: Lexington, 2010. 83–99.
- Peterson, Linda. "Triangulation, Desire, and Discontent in the Life of Charlotte Brontë." SEL: Studies in English Literature 47.4 (2007): 901–920.
- "Playing with the Professor. (Charlotte Brontë's Novel)." CLA Journal 37.3 (1994): 348.
