= Putting Myself Together: Writing 1974— =

- First edition
- Author: Jamaica Kincaid
- Cover artist: Benno Friedman (photograph), Alex Merto (design)
- Language: English
- Publisher: Farrar, Straus, Giroux
- Publication date: 2025
- Publication place: United States
- Media type: Print (hardback)
- Pages: 336
- ISBN: 978-0-374-61323-5

Putting Myself Together: Writing 1974— is a volume of fifty-one essays and other short non-fiction pieces by Jamaica Kincaid published in 2025 by Farrar, Straus and Giroux.

The collection spans writings from 1974 to 2020, including early essays from periodicals such as The New Yorker, The Village Voice, Ms. and Rolling Stone. Several non-fiction works are represented by Forwards and Introductions; three fictional stories also appear. Each essay is provided with a footnote on the title page indicating the journal and date of original publication.

The Introduction to the collection is by Henry Louis Gates, Jr..

Putting Myself Together was dedicated to Aabid Allibhai.

== Contents ==
- The Triumph of Bad and Cool (1974)
- Erotica! (1975)
- If Mammies Ruled the World (1975)
- Pam Grier (1975)
- The Labelle Hustle (1975)
- Last of the Black White Girls (1976)
- Jamaica Kincaid’s New York (1977)
- Antigua Crossings [Fiction] (1978)
- Ovando [Fiction] (1989)
- Athol Fugard [Interview by Jamaica Kincaid] (1990)
- The Finishing Line [Fiction] (1990)
- Forward to Babouk: Voices of Resistance (1991)
- On Seeing England for the First Time (1991)
- Biography of a Dress (1992)
- An Antigua Election Journal (1994)
- Christmas Pictures From a Warm Climate (1994)
- Introduction to The Best American Essays, 1995
- The Little Revenge From the Periphery (1997)
- Introduction to Generations of Women (1998)
- Introduction to My Favorite Plant (1998)
- Introduction to Poetics of Place (1998)
- Looking at Giverny (1998)
- Those Words that Echo...Echo...Echo Through Life (1999)
- Islander Once, Now a Voyager (2000)
- Sowers and Reapers (2001)
- Her Best Friend Provokes to Write About Her Garden (2002)
- Splendor in the Grass (2002)
- The Garden the Year Just Passed (2002)
- The Lure of the Poppy (2002)
- Gardening (2003)
- Living History in Vermont (2003)
- Desert Blooms (2004)
- Jumby Bay (2004)
- Introduction to The Best American Travel Writing (2005)
- Formal Meets Folly (2005)
- Forward to Ian Frazier’s Gone to New York (2006)
- Captain’s Farm (2006)
- Forward to Alexandre Dumas’s Georges (2007)
- Dances with Daffodils (2007)
- Her Infinite Variety (2008)
- The Estrangement (2009)
- Lack, Part Two (2009)
- Tide (2011)
- Introduction to Simone-Schwarz-Bart’s The Bridge of Beyond (2013)
- The Kind of Gardener I Am Not (2018)
- The Walk to Robert Frost’s House (2019)
- A Letter to Robinson Crusoe (2019)
- I See the World (2020)
- Inside the American Snow Dome (2020)
- I was never really making a garden so much as having a conversation (2020)
- The Disturbances of the Garden (2020)

== Reception ==
Describing the volume as “a spirited miscellany,” Kirkus Reviews praises the non-fiction works representing Kincaid’s “recurring themes: writing and gardening, friendship and family, and, most prominently, racism and colonialism.”

The Observer calls the collection“elegant” and “cutting cultural criticism,”adding:

The early pieces showcase a voice already distinctively her own, and binge-reading them now–it’s hard to resist– deepens themes that have proven sustaining, such as friendship, motherhood and gardening as well as race and colonialism.

== Theme ==
Reviewer Sadaf Ferdowsi at Newcity locates the collection’s primary themes in the “colonial legacies” that inform Kinkaid’s work, both fiction and non-fiction:

Melding together history and lyricism, fiction and not-quite-fiction, Kincaid announces her style and an essential theme of her work: How colonial legacies continually wrap themselves around family, language and notions of femininity.

Biographer Henry Louis Gates, Jr. in his Introduction to the collection writes that Kinkaid’s “great subject is her mother, and the powerful ambivalence that that relationship generates.”

Kinkaid’s estrangement from her mother remains throughout these essays the source of a deep and abiding grief. It is also the major condition for their possibility; it is into this breach that she writes.

In her 2009 essay “The Estrangement” published in Harper’s Magazine, Kinkaid wrote: “I am always thinking of my mother; I believe that every action of a certain kind that I make is completely influenced by her, completely infused with her realness, her existence in my life.”

The later essays in this volume often concern Kinkaid’s home gardening, in which horticulture serves as a metaphor reflecting the interactions of organic and nonorganic forms—the confluence of life and death. Kincaid examines this theme in her 2020 essay “I See the World” published in The Paris Review.

== Sources ==
- Ferdowsi, Sadaf. 2025. “If It Grows Together, It Goes Together: A Review of Jamaica Kincaid’s ‘Putting Myself Together. ’” Newcity, August 4, 2025. http//lit.newcity.com/2025/08/04/if-it-grows-together-it-goes-together-a-review-of-jamaica-kincaids-putting-myself-together/ Accessed 20 November, 2025.
- Gates, Henry Louis. 2025. Introduction to Putting Myself Together in Jamaica Kincaid’s Putting Myself Together: Writing 1974—. pp. iv-xviii Farrar, Straus, Giroux, New York. ISBN 978-0-374-61323-5
- Kincaid, Jamaica. 2025. Putting Myself Together: Writing 1974—. Farrar, Straus, Giroux, New York. ISBN 978-0-374-61323-5
