= Mr. Potter (novel) =

Book by Jamaica Kincaid

- Author: Jamaica Kincaid
- Language: English
- Genre: Memoir
- Publisher: Farrar Straus & Giroux
- Publication date: 2002
- Publication place: Antigua
- Media type: Print (Hardback & Paperback)
- Pages: 195 pp (first edition, hardback)
- ISBN: 0-374-21494-8 (first edition, hardback)
- LC Class: 2002100819

Mr. Potter (2002) is a novel by Antiguan born writer Jamaica Kincaid. It tells the story of a girl growing up without a father. When Mr. Potter, the father, died, a part of the girl (Elaine) died with him.
