= Girl (short story) =

Short story by Jamaica Kincaid

"Girl" is a prose poem written by Jamaica Kincaid that was included in At the Bottom of the River (1983). It appeared in the June 26, 1978 issue of The New Yorker.

The theme for "Girl" is a mother-daughter dispute. In this story, the mother goes on and on teaching the daughter how to be the perfect woman in society. As the story goes on, the mother throws jabs at the daughter's behaviors and tendencies. The story is written as one long paragraph.

== Plot summary ==
The prose poem is a to-do list and a how-to-do list containing one sentence of a 650 word dialogue. It features what the girl hears from her (implied) mother. The prose poem is mostly told in the second person. The girl hears her mother's instructions and the behavior her mother is trying to instill in her. It is apparent that the mother is trying to give the girl some sort of advice and prescribing the way she should go about her life and daily tasks. One may infer that her mother probably got this language from someone in her past and it was most likely the way her mother spoke to her when she was a young girl, so that's all she's ever known.

During the prose poem, her mother's voice sounds somewhat condescending and critical when speaking, suggesting that the girl is likely to become a "slut." For example, in the short story, the mother states, "on Sundays try to walk like a lady and not like the slut you are so bent on becoming." There are occasional interruptions from the girl in the story, “but I don't sing benna on Sundays at all and never in Sunday school” reassuring her mother that she is acting the way she is expected. Throughout the piece the mother tries to pass down certain beliefs from her culture to her daughter. The mother constantly reminds her daughter of how to become the "perfect" woman in order to fit into the society that they live in. Also, the chores and behaviors that the mother makes the daughter inhabit are directly related to how women's duties should relate to a man's.

== Background ==
Like most of Kincaid's writing, "Girl" is based on her own relationship between her and her mother while growing up. The author has also revealed in interviews that the setting of this short story is Antigua.
