= A Small Place =

Nonfiction book by Jamaica Kincaid

- Author: Jamaica Kincaid
- Language: English
- Publisher: Farrar, Straus, Giroux
- Publication date: 1988
- Dewey Decimal: 972.92
- LC Class: F2035 .K56

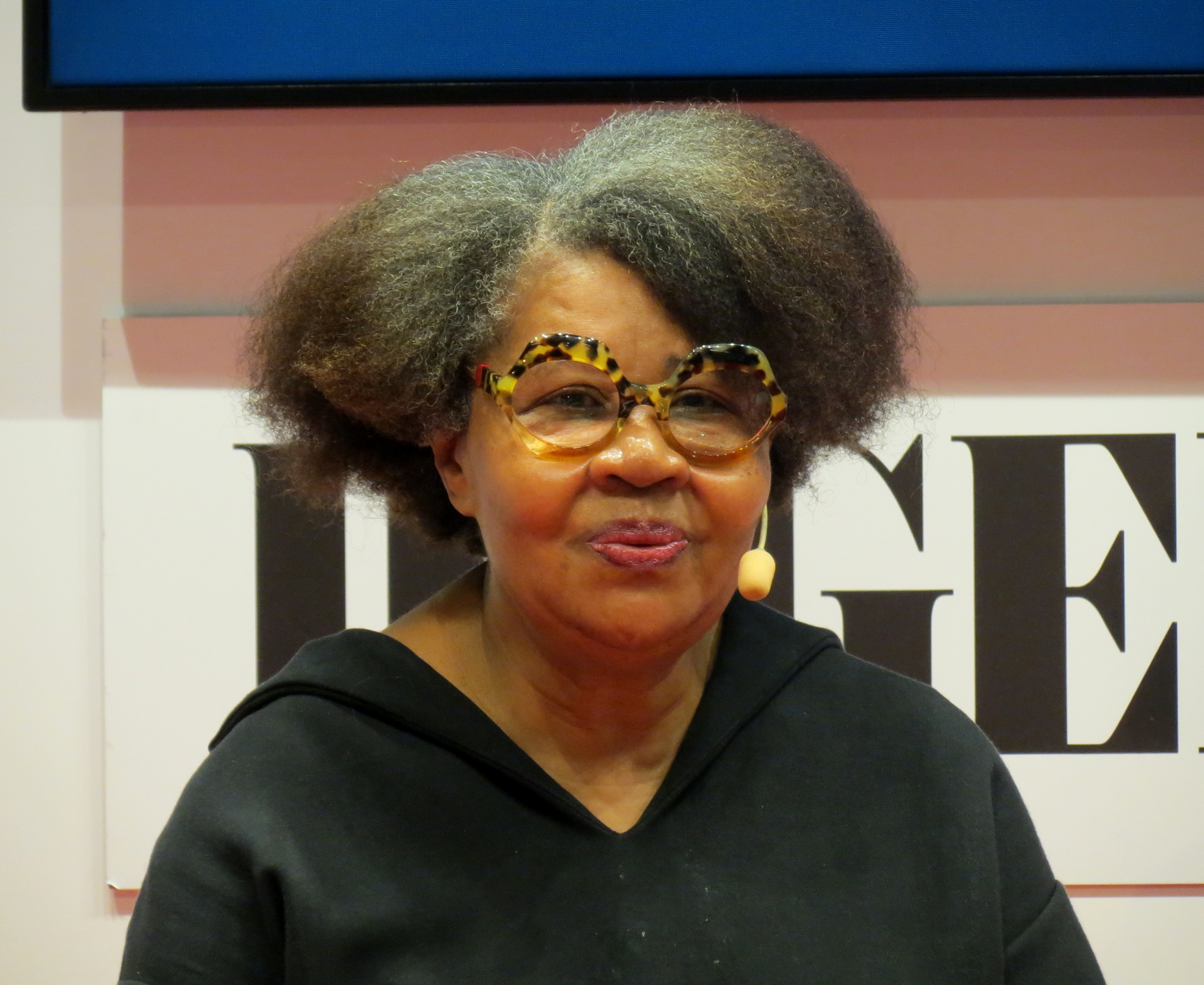
Kincaid in 2019

A Small Place is a work of creative nonfiction published in 1988 by Jamaica Kincaid. A book-length essay drawing on Kincaid's experiences growing up in Antigua, it can be read as an indictment of the Antiguan government, the country's tourist industry and Antigua's colonial legacy. The book, written in four sections, "combines social and cultural critique with autobiography and a history of imperialism to offer a powerful portrait of (post)colonial Antigua."

== History and background ==
In 1493, Christopher Columbus became the first European to visit Antigua on his second voyage. He named it Antigua after the Santa Maria de la Antigua, an icon found in Seville's cathedral. Sir Thomas Warner from England was able to colonise the island in 1632 by starting plantations that included tobacco and sugarcane. Warner also introduced slavery to the island. Slaves from West Africa worked on these plantations. Antigua became known as the English Harbourtown for its great location in the Caribbean. In 1834, slavery was finally abolished, but black peoples' economic conditions failed to improve due to "land shortages and the universal refusal of credit".

In her work, Jamaica Kincaid presents her own perspective on her home country, Antigua, while it was under colonial rule and self-governance. She focuses on the impact of tourism and government corruption, both of which became prevalent after independence, on the citizens of Antigua and the consequent changes/continuity in their lives. This social critique led it being described as "an enraged essay about racism and corruption in Antigua" by one reviewer. Kincaid is very unapologetic in her critique of these times, and challenges readers to face the reality and uncomfortable truths of power and oppression.

== Content ==
Part One: In this section, Kincaid speaks directly to the reader. She refers to the reader as "you" and describes the experiences of a tourist of Antigua. She begins with landing in the airport and follows the tourist through their stay in Antigua. In this section, Kincaid emphasises the idea that a tourist is an ugly human being. Kincaid emphasises how the tourism industry perpetuates systems of inequality in Antigua and forces Antiguans to act as servants to white tourists. She also notes how tourists just observe things at face value and do not gain a real understanding of Antigua. Kincaid suggests that tourists are oblivious to reality and use vacations as a way to escape the boredom of their own lives, which is something natives cannot do because they are too poor.

Part Two: In the second section, Kincaid reflects on the Antigua she grew up in. She starts the section by saying, "The Antigua that I knew, the Antigua in which I grew up, is not the Antigua you, a tourist, would see now. That Antigua no longer exists." Kincaid is referring to colonial Antigua, which did not become fully independent from Britain until 1981. She discusses the history and legacy of British rule in Antigua, including her own experiences with the subject. Kincaid criticizes the difficulty of using English:

For isn't it odd that the only language I have in which to speak of this crime [colonialism] is the language of the criminal who committed the crime? And what can that really mean? For the language of the criminal can contain only the goodness of the criminal's deed. The language of the criminal can explain and express the deed only from the criminal's point of view. It cannot explain the horror of the deed, the injustice of the deed, the agony, the humiliation inflicted on me.

As there is no indigenous Antiguan language, she notes how the colonized Antiguans are forced to choose between silence or the language of criminality. As noted by academic Keith E. Byerman, Kincaid "chooses the latter by adopting a discourse of superiority and objectification. She merely reverses the direction of discursive power. Thus, she concedes herself caught in the prisonhouse of the colonizer's language."

Part Three: In this section, Kincaid contemplates post-colonial Antigua. She discusses government corruption and focuses on the desire to repair the library. She also critiques the idea of a Minister of Culture. Kincaid also contends with slavery and its legacy in Antigua. She critiques the way people speak of and remember slavery and act as if emancipation undid all of the issues created by slavery. This section also explains the significance of the title: A Small Place. Kincaid explains that Antigua is a small place not only physically but in the sense that it is interconnected within the community. Despite being a small place, Antigua is subject to a lot of foreign investment and intervention which Kincaid critiques and ties to much of the corruption in post-colonial Antigua. She discusses the drug industry, Swiss banking, French governmental aid, Japanese car dealerships, and Syrian and Lebanese investors.

Part Four: The fourth section is quite short. In this section, Kincaid discusses the almost unnatural beauty of Antigua. She emphasises the idea that Antigua is a small place. She summarises the history of Antigua saying how it was encountered by Columbus in 1493 leading to colonisation and then eventually independence. She refers to the European people who settled in Antigua as "human rubbish from Europe". She also states how the real Antiguans are descendants of slaves (whom Kincaid refers to as "noble and exalted human beings").

== Themes ==
=== Tourism as a neo-colonial structure ===
In the first section of A Small Place, Kincaid employs the perspective of the tourist in order to demonstrate the inherent escapism in creating a distance from the realities of a visited place. Nadine Dolby dissects the theme of tourism in A Small Place and places Kincaid's depiction of tourism in a globalised context that justifies Kincaid's strong feelings toward it. Dolby corroborates Kincaid's depiction of the tourist creating separation by "othering" the locale and the individuals that inhabit it. Furthermore, the tourist industry is linked to a global economic system that ultimately does not translate into benefits for the very Antiguans who enable it.

The tourist may experience the beauty on the surface of Antigua while being wholly ignorant of the actual political and social conditions that the Antiguan tourism industry epitomises and reinforces. Corinna McLeod points out the disenfranchising nature of the tourism industry in its reinforcement of an exploitative power structure. In effect, the industry recolonises Antigua by placing locals at a disenfranchised and subservient position in a global economic system that ultimately does not serve them.

=== Racism and legacies of colonialism ===
While Kincaid expresses anger towards slavery, colonialism and the broken Antiguan identity that it has left in its wake, she avoids retreating to simple racialization in order to explain the past and present, for doing so would further "other" an already marginalized group of people. Kincaid sheds light on the oppressive hierarchical structures of colonialism, which is still evident in the learned power structures of present-day, post-colonial Antigua.

=== Poverty and Corruption ===
One of the biggest critiques Kincaid makes about Antigua as an independent state is the corruption of the Antiguan Government. The withdrawal of European colonisation left Antigua in a state of poverty and corruption. Kincaid's frustration with the Antiguan government was made clear throughout the novel, specifically when she referenced a library as a symbol of her perpetual resentment towards colonisation and decolonisation. Not only a symbol of Kincaid's perpetual resentment towards colonisation and decolonisation, but the library is arguably "the chief image of decline and corruption" for Kincaid. To her the island library was once a sacred space and a retreat away from the colonised world that plagued her homeland as a child. More importantly, the library acted as a sort of opening to the greater outside world away from the island. It was unfortunately destroyed by an earthquake in 1974, but after all these years has lacked any sort of reconstruction, only a sign posted that says "Repairs are Pending." This is likely because "the library provides the language and the texts by which Kincaid can learn how to attack the white world." Therefore Kincaid alludes to the reality that in the eyes of the corrupt government there should not exist any sort of tools, such as these library books, which could undermine their rule.

In addition to this, Kincaid makes references towards illegal activities that the Antiguan Government was involved in such as drug smuggling, prostitution, and offshore bank accounts in Switzerland. In Kincaid's novel, poverty and corruption are seen as products of Europe's colonisation and decolonisation of Antigua.

According to academic Suzanne Gauch, while Kincaid acknowledges the racial justifications used by white colonists to institute oppressive policies during Antigua's colonial era, she also attempts to transcend the notions of an inescapable racialised past for Antigua. In doing so she attempts to shape readers' view of Antigua by creating a sense of agency.

== Critical reception ==
Kincaid's work has received mixed reviews, both positive and negative. Some of her overall reactions in the United States were characterised as immediate and enthusiastic. The anger that people felt from her attacking nature in her reading simultaneously lent certain strength to her argument about the postcolonial condition of the Antiguan people by manifesting itself as an authentic and emotional account. She uses her anger about the situation as a way to definitively inform readers about the postcolonial Antiguan daily life. Being an enraged essay focusing on racism and the effects of colonialism, some people account for the most consistent and striking aspect of her work to be what critic Susan Sontag calls her "emotional truthfulness". Sontag describes Kincaid's writing as "poignant, but it's poignant because it's so truthful and it's so complicated. ... She doesn't treat these things in a sentimental or facile way."

In 1988, A Small Place was criticised as a vitriolic attack on the government and people of Antigua. New Yorker editor Robert Gottlieb refused to publish it. According to Jamaica Kincaid: Writing Memory, Writing Back to the Mother she was not only banned unofficially for five years from her home country, but she voiced concerns that had she gone back in that time, she worried she would be killed.

Jane King, in A Small Place Writes Back, declared that "Kincaid does not like the Caribbean very much, finds it dull and boring and would rather live in Vermont. There can really be no difficulty with that, but I do not see why Caribbean people should admire her for denigrating our small place in this destructively angry fashion." Moira Ferguson, a feminist academic, argued that as "an African-Caribbean writer Kincaid speaks to and from the position of the other. Her characters are often maligned by history and subjected to a foreign culture, while Kincaid herself has become an increasingly mainstream American writer."
