= William Shawn =

American editor of The New Yorker (1907–1992)

- Born: William Chon; August 31, 1907; Chicago, Illinois, U.S.
- Died: December 8, 1992 (aged 85); New York City, U.S.
- Occupation: Magazine editor
- Spouse: Cecille Lyon (m. 1928)
- Children: 3, including Wallace Shawn and Allen Shawn

William Shawn (né Chon; August 31, 1907 – December 8, 1992) was an American magazine editor who edited The New Yorker from 1952 until 1987.

== Early life and education ==
Shawn was born William Chon on August 31, 1907, in Chicago, Illinois, to Benjamin T. Chon, a cutlery salesman, and Anna Bransky Chon. He was the youngest of five. His older siblings were Harold (1892–1967), Melba (1894–1964), Nelson (1898–1974), and Myron (1902–1987). His family were non-observant Jews from Eastern Europe. William dropped out of the University of Michigan after two years (1925–1927) and began working.

== Career ==
=== Early years ===
Shawn traveled to Las Vegas, New Mexico, where he worked at the local newspaper, The Optic. He returned to Chicago and worked as a journalist. Around 1930 he changed the spelling of his last name to Shawn. In 1932, he and his wife, Cecille, moved to New York City, where he tried to start a career as a composer.

=== At The New Yorker ===
Soon after their arrival in New York City, Cecille took a fact checking job at The New Yorker magazine, and her husband began working there in 1933. His temperament contrasted with that of the magazine's founder Harold Ross. Colleagues later described him as "shy", "deferential", having a "strange presence". Lillian Ross recalled that Shawn believed in the value of every life, even that of Hitler. Shawn stayed with the magazine for 53 years.

==== As assistant editor ====
Shawn rose to assistant editor of The New Yorker and oversaw the magazine's coverage of World War II. He had been trying to get a story out of John Hersey for years. After Life magazine rejected Hersey's profile of future president John F. Kennedy, Shawn seized the opportunity. The story ran in The New Yorker and was reprinted in the Reader's Digest. Hundreds of thousands of copies were distributed during Kennedy's campaigns for the U.S. House of Representatives and the presidency. In 1946, Shawn persuaded Ross to run Hersey's story about the atomic bombing of Hiroshima as the entire contents of one issue. He left for a few months shortly after that to write on his own, but soon returned.

==== As editor ====
A few weeks after Ross died in December 1951, Shawn was named editor. His quiet style was a marked contrast to Ross's noisy manner. Whereas Ross constantly wrote letters to his contributors, Shawn hated to share anything, especially on paper. His shyness was office (and New York) legend, as were his claustrophobia and fear of elevators; many of his colleagues maintain that he carried a hatchet in his briefcase, in case he became trapped.

Shawn would buy articles and then not run them for years, if ever. Staff members were given offices and salaries even if they produced little for the magazine; Joseph Mitchell, whose work had appeared regularly during the 1950s and early 1960s, continued to come to his office from 1965 until his death in 1996 without ever publishing another word. Shawn gave writers vast space to cover their subjects, and nearly all of them (including Dwight Macdonald, Hannah Arendt, and England's Kenneth Tynan) spoke reverently of him. J. D. Salinger adored him, and dedicated Franny and Zooey to Shawn.

While The Addams Family comics debuted in The New Yorker in 1938, Shawn banned them from the publication following the release of the 1964 TV series, as he did not want the image of his publication associated with a mainstream sitcom. The ban remained in effect long after the TV series concluded, persisting until Shawn's retirement in 1987.

==== Later years ====
When Advance Publications bought the magazine in 1985, the new owners promised that the magazine's editorship would not change hands until Shawn chose to retire. But speculation about his successor, a longtime topic of publishing-world chatter, grew.

Shawn had been editor for a very long time, and the usual criticism of the magazine—that it had become stale and dull—was growing more pointed. In retrospect, the journalist Joseph Nocera described him as "legendary, if wildly overrated." Advance chairman S.I. Newhouse forced Shawn out in February 1987, and—after reportedly telling Shawn that he would honor his request to name his deputy Charles McGrath to succeed him—replaced Shawn with Robert Gottlieb, the editor-in-chief at the well-regarded book publisher Alfred A. Knopf.

Saturday Night Live executive producer Lorne Michaels, a longtime admirer, gave Shawn office space in the Brill Building, and he soon took an editorship at Farrar, Straus and Giroux, a largely honorary post that he held until his death in 1992.

== Awards and achievements ==
In 1988, Shawn received the George Polk Career Award in recognition of his lifelong achievements.

== Personal life ==
Shawn married journalist Cecille Lyon (1906–2005) in 1928, and the couple had three children: writer and actor Wallace Shawn, and twins Allen Shawn and Mary. Mary, who was eventually diagnosed with autism, was sent away from the family when she was eight years old to attend a special school, and later institutionalized. Allen became a composer. In 2007, he published a memoir, Wish I Could Be There, centering on his phobias. In 2010, he published a memoir, Twin, about his childhood and his relationship with his sister.

In 1996, Shawn's longtime New Yorker colleague Lillian Ross wrote in a memoir that she and Shawn had had an affair from 1950 until his death, with Lyon's knowledge. Ross said that Shawn was also active in raising her adopted son, Erik. The memoir's publication was controversial, in part because Shawn deeply valued his privacy.

== Influences and legacy ==
- In 1998, Indian author Ved Mehta, who worked with Shawn at The New Yorker for almost three decades, published a biography of Shawn, Remembering Mr. Shawn's New Yorker: The Invisible Art of Editing.

== In popular culture ==
- Shawn was portrayed in the 2005 film Capote by Bob Balaban and in the 2012 film Hannah Arendt by Nicholas Woodeson.

Preceded by Harold Ross	Editor of The New Yorker; 1951–1987	Succeeded by Robert Gottlieb
