= Annie John =

1985 novel by Jamaica Kincaid

- Author: Jamaica Kincaid
- Language: English
- Genre: Novel
- Publisher: Hill & Wang Pub (US) & Vintage (UK)
- Publication date: March 1985
- Publication place: Antigua
- Media type: Print (hardback & paperback)
- Pages: 160 p. (paperback edition)
- ISBN: 0-374-10521-9 (hardback edition) & ISBN 0-09-977381-3 (UK paperback edition)
- OCLC: 11550274
- Dewey Decimal: 813/.54 19
- LC Class: PR9275.A583 K5634

Annie John, a novel written by Jamaica Kincaid in 1985, details the growth of a girl in Antigua, an island in the Caribbean. It covers issues as diverse as mother-daughter relationships, same-sex attraction, racism, clinical depression, poverty, education, and the struggle between medicine based on "scientific fact" and that based on "native superstitious know-how".

== Plot summary ==
Annie John, the book's protagonist, starts as a young girl who worships her mother. She follows her everywhere and is shocked and hurt when she learns that she must someday live in a different house from her mother. While her mother tries to teach her to become a lady, Annie is sent to a new school where she must prove herself intellectually and make new friends. She then falls in love with a girl named Gwen. She promises Gwen that she will always love her. However, Annie later admires a girl she calls the "Red Girl." She admires this girl in all aspects of her life. This girl means freedom to Annie because she does not have to follow any daily hygienic routines like the other girls.

Annie John is then moved to a higher class because of her intelligence. For this reason, Annie is drawn away from her best friend, Gwen, while alienating herself from her mother and the other adults. It later becomes clear that she also suffers from some mental depression, which distances her from both her family and her friends. The book ends with her physically distancing herself from all she knows and loves by leaving home for nursing school in England.

== Publication history ==
The book's chapters were originally published separately in The New Yorker, before being combined and published as the novel Annie John, the stories connected by Kincaid's use of Annie John as the narrator.

== Major themes, symbolism, and style ==
Children growing apart from their parents while becoming adolescents is the major theme in the novel. Annie and her mother share common personalities and goals and even look exactly alike, though they grow apart through the narrative. Barbara Wiedemann writes that Kincaid's fiction is not specifically aimed at a young adult audience. Still, the readers will benefit from the insight evident in Kincaid's description of coming of age.

Annie John has been noted to contain feminist views. Asked if the relationship between Annie and Gwen was meant to suggest "lesbian tendencies," Kincaid replied: "No…I think I am always surprised that people interpret it so literally." The relationship between Gwen and Annie is a practicing relationship. It's about how things work. It's like learning to walk. Always, there is the sense that they would go on to lead heterosexual lives. Whatever happened between them, homosexuality would not be a serious thing because it is just practicing" (Vorda 94).

Water is consistently used throughout the novel to depict the separation between Annie John and her mother. Symbolic references to water (including the sea, rain, and other forms) illustrate Annie's development from childhood to maturity. Near the novel's start, the reader learns that Annie has a regular baby bottle and one shaped like a boat - and that is only the beginning of her water-connected choices in life. Kincaid's writing is not in the traditional paragraph form but in run-on sentences and paragraphs with little fragments. Jan Hall, a writer for Salem Press Master Plots, Fourth Edition book, states in an article about Annie John that "because the novel has no years, months, or dates, the story has a sense of timelessness."

== Connections to other works ==
There are clear echoes of themes and ghost events from Kincaid's books Lucy and My Brother. My Brother is a non-fiction story, yet Annie John has some of the same events and facts placed in her own family as if Annie was Kincaid when she was younger. In My Brother, Kincaid's father had to walk after he ate because he had an impaired digestive tract and heart; their family ate fish, bread, and butter, and a six-year-old died in her mother's arm going over the same bridge that her father had recently walked on after eating. The character of Miss Charlotte dies in both books. Lucy can be cited as a continuation of Annie John because Annie John has moved off of her Caribbean island of Antigua and is starting a new life in England, even though Lucy is in America because hypothetically, Annie John will have to learn how to adjust to England. Jan Hall writes: "the themes of Annie John, Jamaica Kincaid’s first novel, are continued in Lucy (1990), a novel about a young woman’s experiences after leaving her Caribbean island."

== Bibliography ==
- Deborah E. Mistron. Understanding Jamaica Kincaid's Annie John: a student casebook to issues, sources, and historical documents. Greenwood Publishing Group, (1999) ISBN 0-313-30254-5
