= Allen Shawn =

American composer and writer

- Born: Allen Evan Shawn; August 27, 1948 (age 78); New York City, U.S.
- Education: Harvard University (BA); Columbia University (MA)
- Occupations: Composer; pianist; educator; author
- Spouses: Jamaica Kincaid (m. 1979; div. 2002); Yoshiko Sato (m. 2007)
- Children: 3
- Father: William Shawn
- Relatives: Wallace Shawn (brother)

Allen Evan Shawn (born August 27, 1948) is an American composer, pianist, educator, and author based in Vermont.

== His music ==
Shawn began composing at the age of ten, but dates his mature work from 1977. He has written a dozen orchestral works, including a symphony, two piano concertos, a cello concerto, and a violin concerto; three chamber operas; five piano sonatas and many additional works for piano; and a large catalogue of chamber music, songs and choral music. Among Shawn's available recordings are several of chamber music, four CDs of piano music, including a CD devoted to his piano work by German pianist Julia Bartha, a piano concerto performed by Ursula Oppens with the Albany Symphony Orchestra under the direction of David Alan Miller, and the chamber opera The Music Teacher, with a libretto by his brother, Wallace Shawn.

== As author ==
Shawn is the author of a book about Austrian composer Arnold Schoenberg, Arnold Schoenberg's Journey, and a book about Leonard Bernstein, Leonard Bernstein: An American Musician.

He is also the author of Wish I Could Be There: Notes from a Phobic Life, which examines his experiences with anxiety and panic disorder, as well as his relationship with his autistic twin sister Mary, and Twin: A Memoir, also about Mary and his relationship with her. He discussed Twin with Terry Gross on WHYY's Fresh Air on January 3, 2011.

== Personal life ==
Shawn is a son of The New Yorker editor William Shawn, and the brother of the actor and playwright Wallace Shawn. His family is of Jewish background. He received a bachelor's degree from Harvard University, a master's degree from Columbia University, and studied in France with Nadia Boulanger.

He teaches composition and music history at Bennington College and was formerly married to novelist Jamaica Kincaid, with whom he has a son, Harold, and a daughter, Annie.

He is married to pianist Yoshiko Sato, with whom he has a son.

== Books ==
- Arnold Schoenberg's Journey (New York: Farrar, Straus and Giroux, 2002, ISBN 0374105901)
- Wish I Could Be There: Notes from a Phobic Life (New York: Viking, 2007, ISBN 9780670038428)
- Twin: A Memoir (New York: Viking, 2011, ISBN 9780670022373)
- Leonard Bernstein: An American Musician (New Haven: Yale University Press, 2014, ISBN 9780300144284)
- In the Realm of Tones: A Composer's Memoir (University of Rochester Press, 2025, ISBN 9781648251177)
