= Eric Harriz =

J. Eric Harriz is a graduate of NYU's Tisch School of the Arts (1991). He has worked as a Set Designer in Theater, a Set designer, Assistant Art Director and Art Director in Television and as a Set Designer and Production Designer in Film. Harriz is a two-time Daytime Emmy Award winner for his work as a set designer for The City in 1996 and All My Children in 2000. Harriz also designed three productions of Boobs! The Musical: the workshop at The Pulse Theatre and the Off-Broadway hit productions at the Triad Theater and the transfer to Dillon's Reprise Room. From 1991- 2001 Harriz worked for various ABC programs including "Good Morning America", " The Huntley/Brinkley Report", "Loving", "All My Children", "One Life To Live"," The View", "Dr. Oz" and for CBS on "Mad about You" and "The Cosby Show". Harriz has worked as a Set Designer with the Ballet De Monterrey in Monterrey Mexico on their Productions of "Swan Lake", "The Nutcracker" and a new ballet choreographed by Ann Marie DeAngelo entitled "Mademoiselle Maupin". He has also served as an Adjunct Faculty member at Drew University, Madison, NJ and Montclair State University, Montclair NJ, and taught continuing education classes in Lighting Design at Parson New School in NYC.
