= Kristy Cates =

American actress and singer

Kristy Cates-Frankfort
- Born: Kristen Cates; March 14, 1977 (age 49); California, U.S.
- Education: University of Cincinnati (BFA)
- Occupations: Actress, singer
- Website: kristycates.com

Kristen "Kristy" Cates (born March 14, 1977, in California) is an American actress and singer. She is best known for her role as Elphaba in the Chicago production of Wicked and as the original understudy in the 2003 Broadway production. She was previously in the casts of Princess Ida and the off-Broadway production Boobs! The Musical. In 2016, she portrayed Ms. Bassett in Finding Neverland on Broadway and understudied the role of Madame du Maurier. She last appeared on Broadway as Grandma Josephine in Charlie and the Chocolate Factory.

== Early life ==
Cates started her performing career at only 3 years old, singing songs and presenting self-written musicals at home. In the second grade, her talents were recognized by the director of her grammar school musical who heard Cates "crowing" at the roosters who took up residence next to the playground. She was immediately cast as the singing rooster in the Christmas pageant. Cates attended Justin-Siena High School in Napa, California.

She performed in community theater productions around her native Northern California, spending 7 years with the Pinole Young Actors group. At age 17, she was cast in her first professional production and made the decision to pursue a career in theater. She auditioned for, and was accepted to, the University of Cincinnati College-Conservatory of Music where she spent four years, graduating with a BFA in Musical Theater in 1999. She was roommates and friends with Shoshana Bean, a fellow Wicked alum. Upon graduation, Cates was cast in two productions at the St. Louis MUNY before moving to New York City.

== Career ==
After a few months in New York, Cates was cast in the New York Gilbert and Sullivan Players production of Princess Ida. Shortly thereafter, she began to perform with a number of "unknown" writers and composers—presenting a cabaret of their work at the historical club, Don't Tell Mama. Cates worked at several regional theaters such as the Lucille Lortel White Barn Theatre, North Bay Opera, the Playhouse on the Green, Merry-Go-Round Playhouse and at the Eugene O'Neill Theater Conference. As a singer, she has appeared at numerous NYC clubs and theatres including the Duplex, the Producer's Club, Joe's Pub, Don't Tell Mama, XL, the Triad, and Therapy.

In 2003, Cates starred in the off-Broadway production Boobs! The Musical which celebrated the songs of legendary 50's and 60's singer, Ruth Wallis. She played Ruth Wallis along with other characters (including a medicated Mary Poppins, and a Folies Bergère wannabe).

In 2018, she released a jazzy, musical theatre song called "Kristy's Lament (Another Awful Day With the MTA)." After leaving her Broadway show one evening, she had taken to Facebook to recount her disastrous subway ride home. The post went viral, and caught the attention of lyricist Chris Giordano, who adapted Kristy's commute into a musical number, with composer Ryan Edward Wise.

=== Wicked ===
Cates was cast in the musical Wicked as an ensemble member and understudy for the role of Elphaba, which was played by Idina Menzel. The show opened on October 30, 2003, after previews from October 8. She can be heard on the Original Broadway Cast (OBC) recording of the show. As a member of the cast, she performed on the 2004 Tony Awards, Late Show with David Letterman, and at the Macy's Thanksgiving Day Parade. In March 2005, when Stephanie J. Block, who was set to play Elphaba on the show's 1st U.S. tour, injured herself during rehearsals, Cates stepped in. Cates then returned to the Broadway production and played her final performance on May 29, 2005. She then became the standby Elphaba in the Chicago sit-down production of the musical, to Ana Gasteyer of Saturday Night Live.

The Chicago production began previews on June 24, 2005, with an official opening night on July 13, 2005, at the Oriental Theatre (now known as the Nederlander Theatre). On January 24, 2006, Cates replaced Gasteyer in the lead role. For this engagement, she starred opposite Stacie Morgan Lewis and Erin Mackey as G(a)linda. She appeared at the Taste of Chicago and sang the National Anthem on Veterans Weekend at a Chicago Bears football game. Cates left the show on December 10, 2006, and was replaced by her standby, Dee Roscioli.

=== Other shows ===
In January 2007, Cates returned to Chicago for a weekend of Solo Shows that she called "An Inteminent Evening with Kristy Cates". Each of her shows sold out, selling over 350 tickets every night. She sang the National Anthem for the Chicago Cubs and Chicago White Sox games in spring 2007.

Cates was cast as Marty in a production of Grease that played in St. Louis at The Muny from June 25 to July 3, 2007. She also took part in the reading of a new musical called City of Light.

Cates starred as Tracy Boyd in the musical Unbeatable. The show played in Phoenix and Houston before opening Off-Broadway at New World Stages on October 10, 2008. In February 2010, Cates starred as Susan in the Lyric Theatre at the Plaza production of the Stephen Schwartz musical Snapshots in the Plaza District of Oklahoma City. In April 2014 she starred alongside the majority of the original cast of the off-Broadway musical comedy The Bardy Bunch, a parody in Shakespearean style of the two television shows The Partridge Family and The Brady Bunch.

In 2016 it was announced that she would join Jack O'Brien's production of Charlie and the Chocolate Factory as Grandma Josephine.

== Educator ==
Cates currently serves as the Chair of the Performing Arts Program of the New York Film Academy Musical Theatre School and has produced or directed student productions of Spring Awakening, Chess, Wedding Singer and Carousel.
