= Roscioli =

Roscioli is a surname. Notable people with the surname include:

- Dee Roscioli (born 1977), American singer and actress
- Fabio Roscioli (born 1965), Italian cyclist
