= DeSales University =

Catholic university in Center Valley, Pennsylvania, US

Coordinates: 40.540°N 75.377°W

- Former name: Allentown College of Saint Francis de Sales (1964–2000)
- Motto: "Be Who You Are and Be That Well"
- Type: Private university
- Established: 1964; 62 years ago
- Religious affiliation: Catholic Church (Oblates of St. Francis de Sales)
- Academic affiliations: LVAIC
- Endowment: $127.1 million (2025)
- President: James J. Greenfield
- Provost: Terese Wignot
- Faculty: 133 full-time, 234 part-time
- Students: 2,986 (fall 2024)
- Undergraduates: 2,138 (fall 2024)
- Postgraduates: 814 (fall 2024)
- Location: Center Valley, Pennsylvania, U.S.
- Campus: Suburban, 550 acres (220 ha)
- Colors: Blue & red
- Nickname: Bulldogs
- Sporting affiliations: NCAA Division III; MAC
- Mascot: Frankie the Bulldog
- Website: www.desales.edu

DeSales University (DSU) is a private Catholic university in Center Valley, Pennsylvania, United States. The university offers traditional, online, and hybrid courses and programs at the undergraduate and graduate levels. Named for St. Francis de Sales, the university was founded in 1964 as Allentown College of Saint Francis de Sales by the Oblates of St. Francis de Sales.

DeSales has six academic divisions: Business, Healthcare Professions, Liberal Arts and Social Sciences, Nursing, Performing Arts, and Sciences & Mathematics. It is classified among "Doctoral/Professional Universities".

== History ==
=== 20th century ===
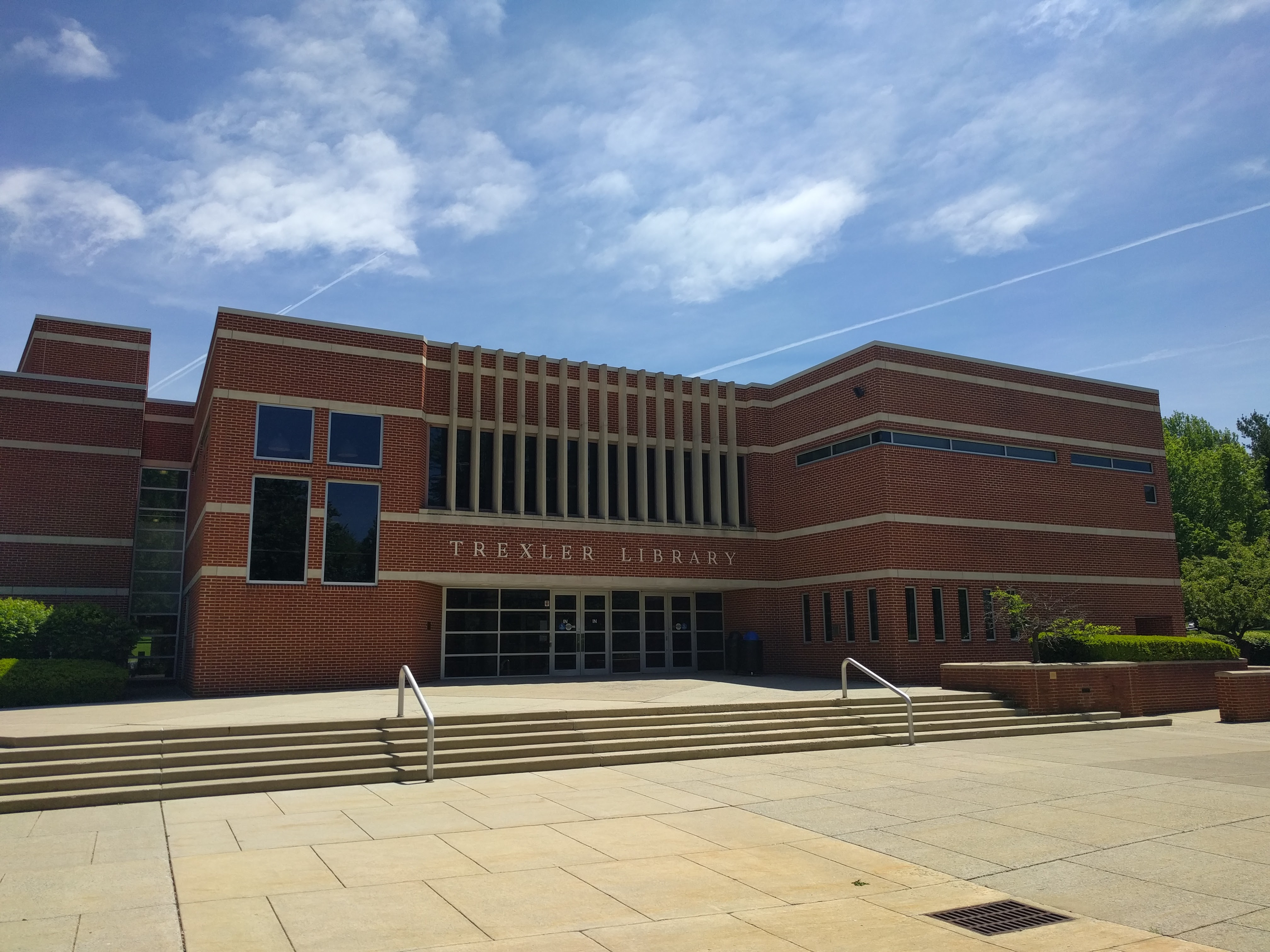
The entrance to Trexler Library at DeSales University in May 2017

At the request of Bishop of the Allentown Diocese, Joseph McShea, the Oblates of St. Francis de Sales began planning for the new college in April 1962, and the charter for Allentown College of St. Francis de Sales, with full power to award the Bachelor of Arts and Bachelor of Science degrees, was granted by the Commonwealth of Pennsylvania on May 27, 1964. Classes began for freshmen in September 1965. Allentown College was fully accredited by the Middle States Association of Colleges and Schools during the 1969–1970 academic year. In September 1970, the college became a co-educational institution. The college's continuing education department was established in 1977. In the spring of 1988, the college opened the Easton campus for an evening degree program.

A Master of Science in Nursing degree was introduced in 1984; the Master of Science in Management Information Systems in September 1988; and an M.Ed. program in the summer of 1989.

In August 1991, the college began its Master of Business Administration (MBA) program which has now grown to be the second-largest MBA program among universities and colleges in Pennsylvania.

=== 21st century ===
In 2000, Allentown College received university status from the Pennsylvania Department of Education, and the university's name was changed to DeSales University. In 2018, James J. Greenfield began serving as the university's fourth president.

== Academics ==
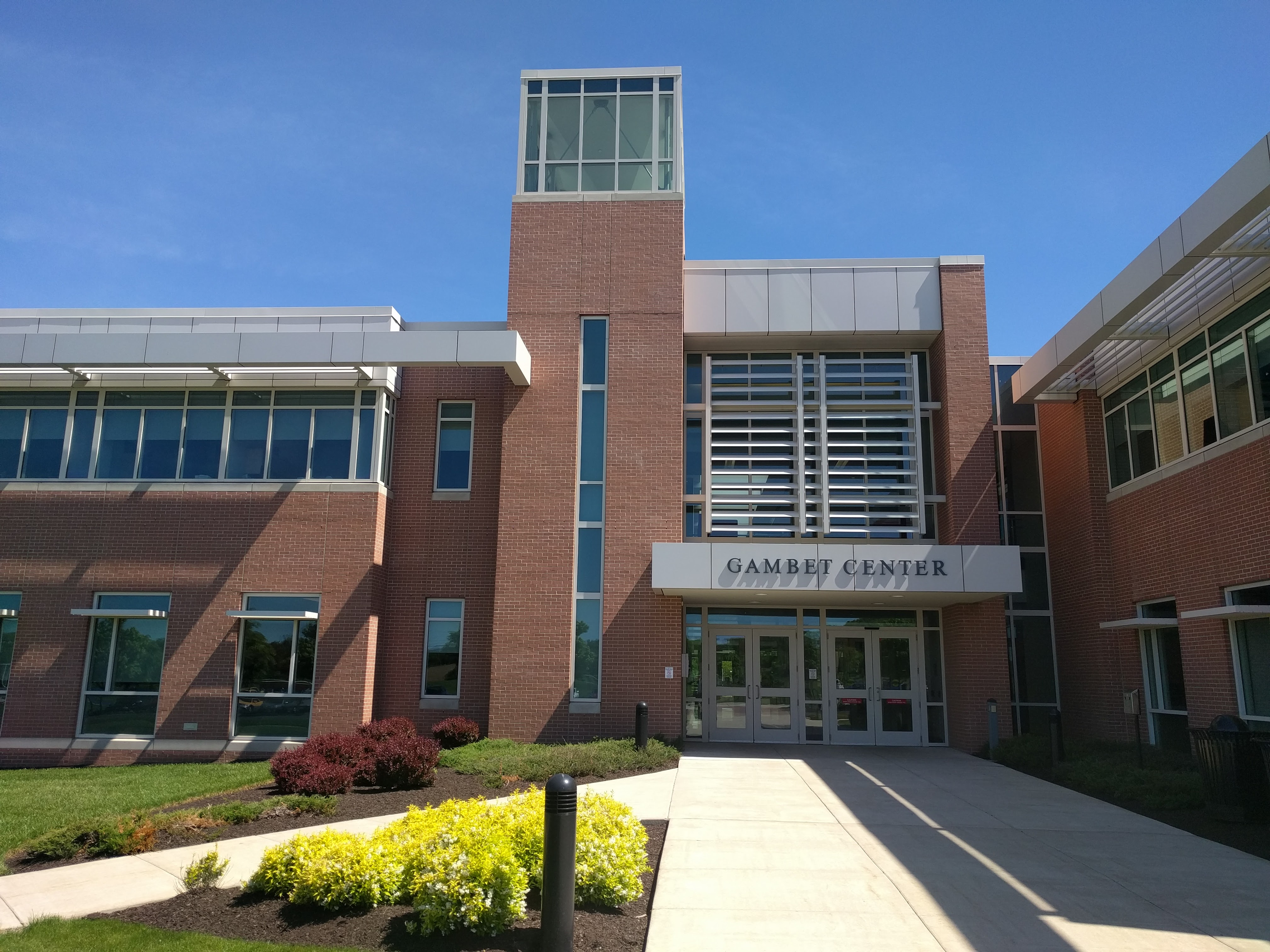
The main entrance to the Gambet Center for Business and Healthcare at DeSales University

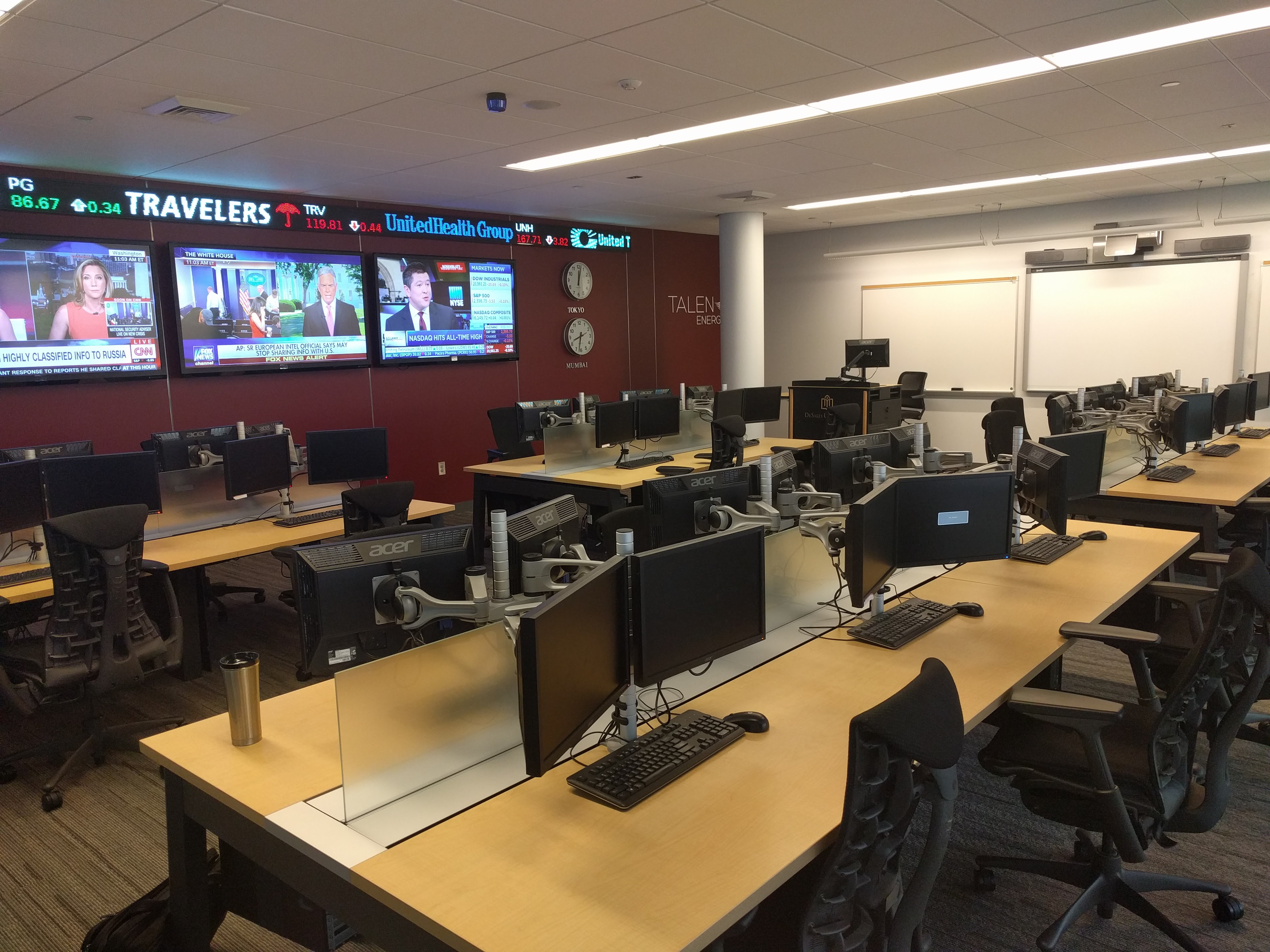
The trading room in the Gambet Center at DeSales University

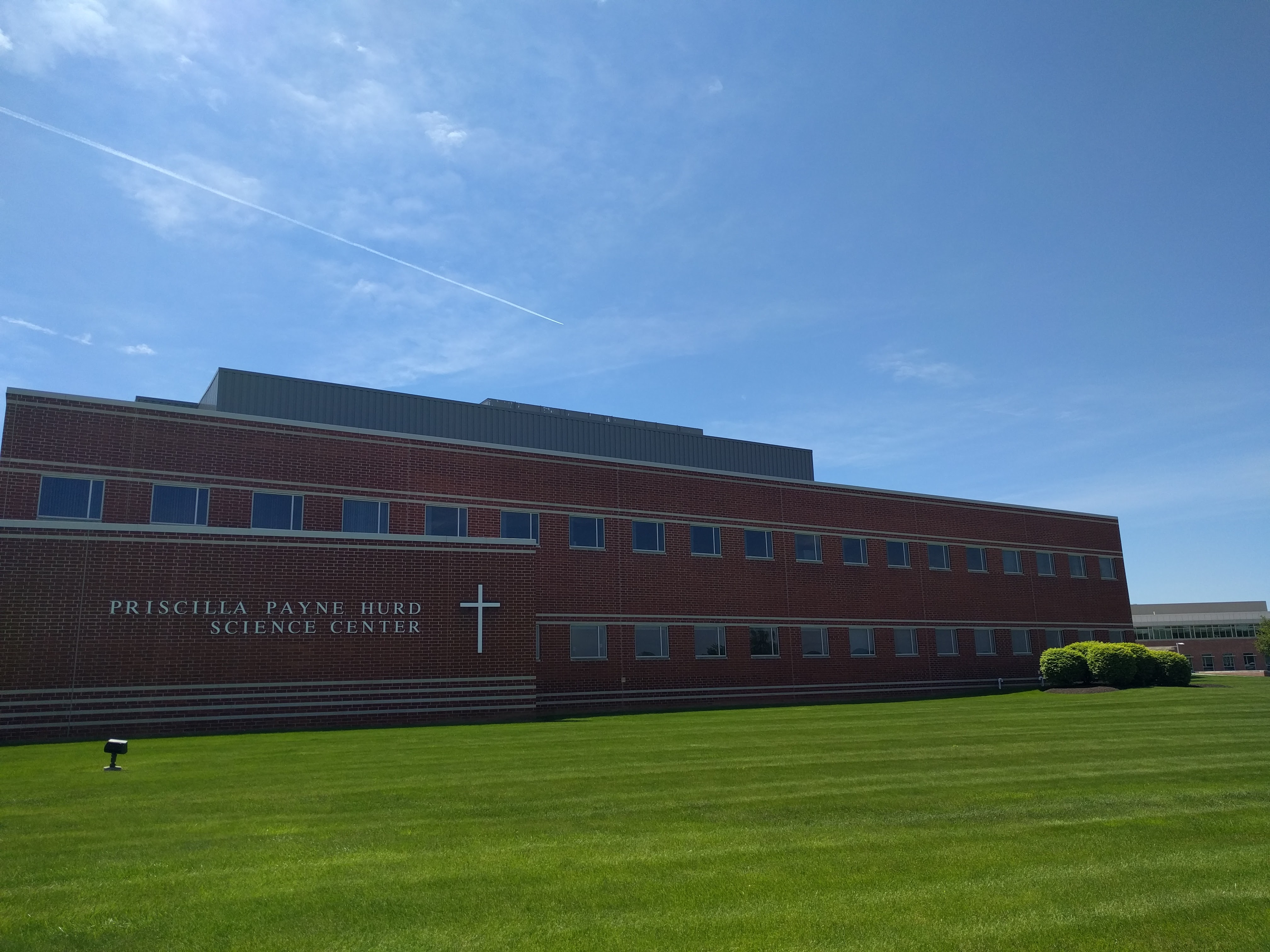
The front of the Hurd Science Center at DeSales University

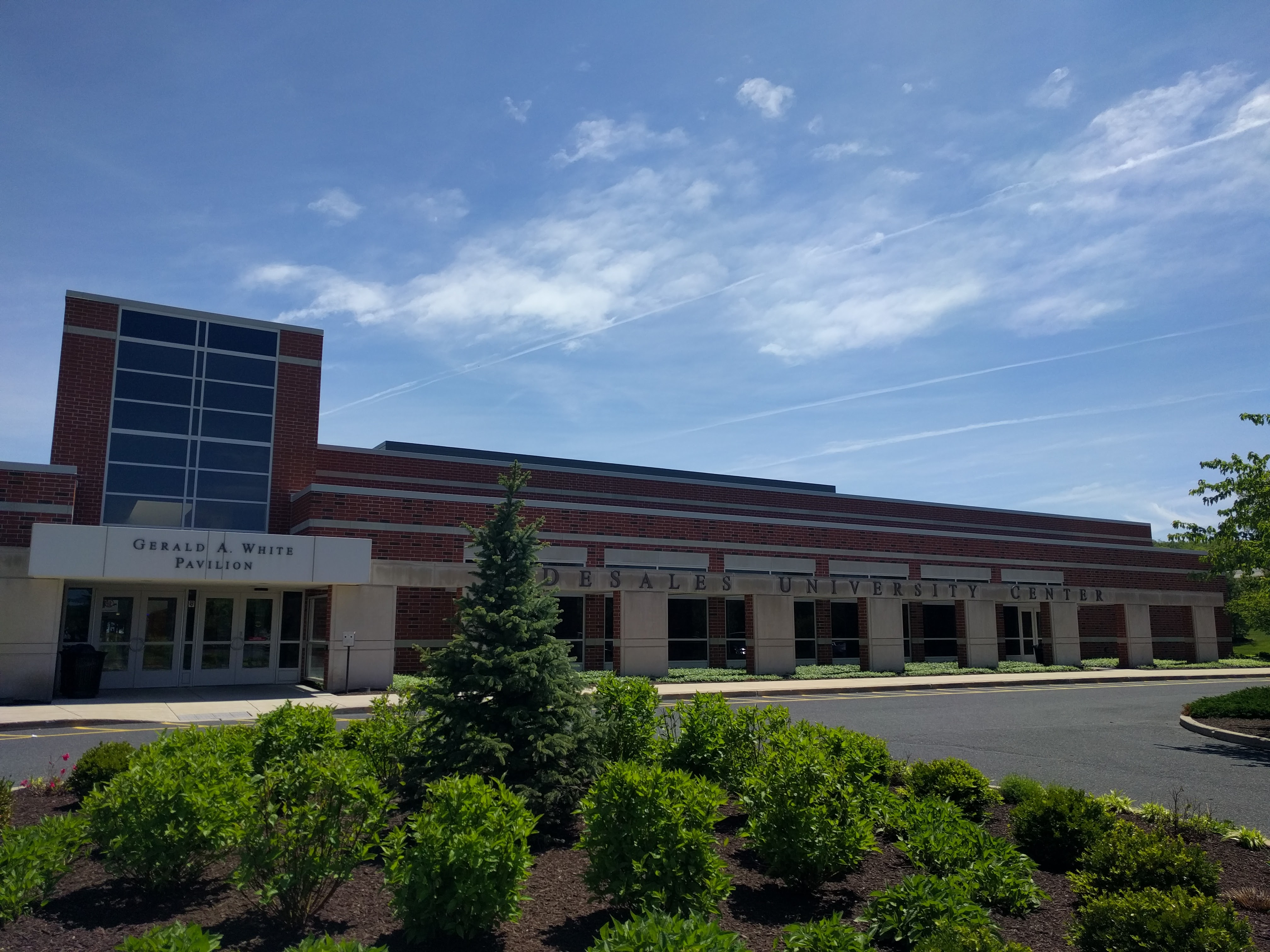
The main entrance to DeSales University Center

The student-faculty ratio at DeSales University is 12:1, and the school has 54.3 percent of its classes with fewer than 20 students. The most popular majors at DeSales University include: Registered Nursing/Registered Nurse; Business Administration and Management, General; Psychology, General; Accounting; Health Professions and Related Clinical Sciences, Other; Drama and Dramatics/Theatre Arts, General; Criminal Justice/Safety Studies; Biology/Biological Sciences, General; Finance, General; and Marketing/Marketing Management, General. The average freshman retention rate, an indicator of student satisfaction, is 82 percent.

More than 80% of undergraduate, full-time day students receive some form of financial aid.

=== Rankings ===
The 2026 edition of Best Colleges from U.S. News & World Report ranked DeSales University as 283rd in "National Universities".

=== Accreditations ===
DeSales is accredited by the Middle States Commission on Higher Education. Its nursing program is accredited by the Commission on Collegiate Nursing Education (CCNE). The Physician Assistant Program also holds accreditation from the Commission on the Accreditation of Allied Health Programs (CAAHEP). Business and business related programs are accredited by the Accreditation Council for Business Schools and Programs (ACBSP). DeSales University's Doctor of Physical Therapy program has received accreditation from the Commission on Accreditation in Physical Therapy Education (CAPTE). Financial planning programs are CFP Board Registered Programs.

=== Salesian Center for Faith and Culture ===
Established in 2000, the Salesian Center for Faith and Culture is the first center for research and development at DeSales University. It sponsors annual events for students, including the Heritage Week celebrations, the Center Valley Forum series, the Ruggiero Lectures, and the John Paul II Arts & Culture series.

The Salesian Center administers the Forum for Ethics in the Workplace, a study center for responsible business conduct.

== Campus ==
The main DeSales campus is located on over 400 acres (160 ha) in Upper Saucon Township, Pennsylvania in the southern Lehigh Valley region of the state. The developed part of the campus, comprising 163 acres (0.66 km^{2}), is listed as the DeSales University census-designated place, with a residential population of 953 as of the 2010 census.

=== Buildings ===
Dooling Hall is named in honor of J. Stuart Dooling, the first president of Allentown College of St. Francis de Sales. Dooling Hall is the main academic building and is home to the majority of liberal arts classrooms.

The Gambet Center for Business and Health Care Education includes simulation laboratories, globally integrated classrooms and administrative operations for undergraduate and graduate health care and business degree programs. This building is named for Daniel G. Gambet, a former president of DeSales University.

The Hurd Science Center is a 36,000 square feet (3,300 m^{2}) facility located on Station Avenue (on the Brisson Campus side). The center is named in honor of Mrs. Priscilla Payne Hurd, a generous benefactor of numerous buildings and programs throughout the Lehigh Valley. The building features 24-seat laboratories designed specifically for the various science disciplines offered at DeSales, a 99-seat lecture hall, conference rooms, faculty offices, and small individual laboratories for faculty and student research.

The Labuda Center is home to the theatre, dance, and television and film departments. The Labuda Center has three stages, a dance studio, and a TV/Film studio. The Iacocca Studio has television and film equipment. The Main Stage Theater is the primary performance space for the theater and dance programs. Its auditorium seats 473. The Schubert Theater is a 200-seat, black-box performing space with the furthest seat no more than 25 feet (7.5 m) from the stage. The first production was staged on February 26, 1982.

Trexler Library, in the center of campus, was built in 1988. The 36,000 square feet (3,300 m^{2}) facility includes over 141,000 paper books and 130,000 electronic books, 265 newspaper and paper journal subscriptions, access to over 12,000 full text online journals, and over 8,000 educational streaming videos.

== Student life ==
There are several student clubs and organizations.

=== Athletics ===
Varsity Sports
Men's sports	Women's sports
Baseball	Softball
Basketball	Basketball
Cross country	Cross country
Lacrosse	Lacrosse
Golf	Volleyball
Soccer	Soccer
Tennis	Tennis
Track & Field^{†}	Track & Field^{†}
Esports (co-ed)	Field Hockey
† – Track and field includes both indoor and outdoor.

Billera Hall is an 82,500 square feet (7,660 m^{2}) recreational facility with a fitness center with weights and aerobic areas, a gym with 3 full basketball courts, a running track and roll down curtains that can separate the large space into 3 smaller stations as needed for basketball, volleyball, or tennis. As one large space, the courts can be used for lacrosse, baseball, or track practice. Outdoor facilities include a soccer field, turf field for lacrosse field, softball field, baseball field, and track.

DeSales has 18 varsity athletic teams. They compete in NCAA Division III within the MAC Freedom of the Middle Atlantic Conferences. Club sports include: swimming, tennis, cheerleading, the dance team, equestrian team, men's and women's rugby, men's ice hockey and men's volleyball.

In 2017, DeSales women's basketball earned an at-large bid to the NCAA Division III tournament.

==== Mascot ====
Frankie the Bulldog is a French Bulldog, and varsity athletic teams use the nickname "Bulldogs." Before 2001, the mascot for Allentown College was a centaur, and teams used the moniker "Allentown College Centaurs".

=== Student media ===
The DeSales Messenger is the university's student-run newspaper. WDSR is the university's internet radio-only station.

== Affiliations ==
DeSales is a private, four-year Catholic university for men and women administered by the Oblates of St. Francis de Sales. DeSales is also a member of the Lehigh Valley Association of Independent Colleges (LVAIC), which offers cross-registration and interlibrary loan with other Lehigh Valley-based institutions.

=== Pennsylvania Shakespeare Festival ===
The Division of Performing Arts hosts the annual Pennsylvania Shakespeare Festival and features a 473-seat theater commercially operated by students.

=== Center for Data Analytics ===
The DeSales University Division of Business hosts the Center for Data Analytics.

=== DeSales Free Clinic at Allentown Rescue Mission ===
A student-run, student-funded clinic provides completely free primary and acute care, laboratory services and medications to the men seeking shelter or enrolled in a recovery program at the Allentown Rescue Mission.

== Notable alumni ==
- Steve Burns, actor (attended, but did not graduate)
- Jim Chern, Catholic priest and co-host of The Catholic Guy Show on SiriusXM satellite radio
- Alexie Gilmore, actress
- Michele Knotz, actress
- Bryan Kohberger, convicted murderer
- Peter Augustine Lawler, professor, author, and lecturer
- Joseph F. Leeson Jr., judge of the United States District Court for the Eastern District of Pennsylvania
- Roger MacLean, former mayor of Allentown, Pennsylvania
- Niki and Gabi, actresses (attended but did not graduate)
- Ilia Isorelýs Paulino, actress
- Stacie Lynn Renna, actress
- Zack Robidas, actor
- Dee Roscioli, actress
- Marnie Schulenburg, actress

== Notable faculty ==
- Chuck Gloman, cinematographer
- Richard Noll, historian of medicine, anthropologist and clinical psychologist
- Katherine Ramsland, true-crime author
