= Kate Fahrner =

American actress and singer

Kate Fahrner is an American actress and singer.

== Career ==
She appeared in the Broadway production of Wicked as the standby for Glinda. She appeared in the South Pacific, The Full Monty and Cats national tours. She appeared in the Off-Broadway play Under My Skin with Kerry Butler and Megan Sikora as well as the musical production of Sarah, Plain and Tall in 2006 as an understudy for Anna and Caleb.

She played Glinda in the Chicago production of Wicked. She joined as part of the ensemble in 2006 and began to understudy Erin Mackey in early 2007, before replacing her in the role for a limited seven-week period from April 15 through June 1, 2008. She was replaced by Annaleigh Ashford. Fahrner recently joined the Broadway company, replacing Laura Woyasz as the Glinda standby on August 23, 2011.

She played Amber Von Tussle in the Walnut Street Theatre production of Hairspray. She was seen again at Philadelphia's Walnut Street Theatre in their all-new production of Garson Kanin's Born Yesterday, running March 10 through April 26, 2009. She performed in the national tour of South Pacific as part of the ensemble and understudy for Nellie Forbush. She performed in Cabaret as Sally Bowles at the John W. Engeman Theater (Northport, New York) from February 3, 2011 to March 27. She played Jovie in the Walnut Street Theatre production of Elf in 2013.

She played Fantine in the 2015 production of Les Misérables at the Pennsylvania Shakespeare Festival
