= Zack Robidas =

American actor

Zack Robidas is an American actor known for his roles on Succession, Friends from College, Sorry for Your Loss, and Fleishman Is in Trouble.

== Career ==
Robidas is a native of Berks County, Pennsylvania and graduated from DeSales University in Center Valley, Pennsylvania. As a teenager, he attended Central Catholic High School in Reading, Pennsylvania. Also a theater actor, Robidas co-starred in Pretty Theft by Adam Szymkowicz.

== Personal life ==
Robidas was married to actress Marnie Schulenburg from 2013 until her death in 2022. They had a daughter together named Coda Jones Lindsay Robidas (born December 12, 2019). Schulenburg's cancer was misdiagnosed as mastitis in early 2020 and after three rounds of antibiotics, a skin biopsy revealed she had Stage IV, metastatic inflammatory breast cancer. Since Schulenburg's death, Robidas has been trying to gather support for Marnie's Law, which would require nursing programs to educate students about inflammatory breast cancer if passed.

== Filmography ==
=== Film ===
Year	Title	Role	Notes
2005	In Convenience	Mark	
2007	Tooth and Nail	Yukon	
2009	It's Complicated	Hotel Reception Clerk	
2012	Arbitrage	Tom - Brooke's Boyfriend	
2013	The Golden Scallop	Corey Clark	
2014	The Humbling	Albany	
2016	Better Off Single	Frat Guy Manager	
2018	Empathy, Inc.	Joel	

=== Television ===
Year	Title	Role	Notes
2006	Law & Order	Officer Simone	Episode: "In Vino Veritas"
2007	Law & Order: Criminal Intent	Chad	Episode: "Self-made"
2009	Kings	William's Associate	2 episodes
2010	The Pretty Good Sports Show	Zack	Television film
2010	CSI: NY	Reporter #1	Episode: "Hide Sight"
2010	30 Rock	Godzilla	Episode: "Chain Reaction of Mental Anguish"
2011	I Just Want My Pants Back	Meyers	Episode: "Pilot"
2012	Dick Punch	Tom Brady	3 episodes
2013	Blue Bloods	Officer Peter Grasso	Episode: "Devil's Breath"
2015	Mozart in the Jungle	Bradford's Dad	Episode: "Amusia"
2017	The Defenders	Architect	Episode: "Worst Behavior"
2018–2023	Succession	Mark Ravenhead	7 episodes
2018–2019	Sorry for Your Loss	Drew Burmester	9 episodes
2019	Friends from College	Charlie	8 episodes
2019	New Amsterdam	Michaela Archer	Episode: "Five Miles West"
2022	Fleishman Is in Trouble	Rick Hertz	3 episodes
2024	Law & Order: Special Victims Unit	Peter Flynn	4 episodes
2025	Dying for Sex	Hooper	2 episodes

=== Stage ===
Year	Title	Role	Theater
2006	Othello	Cassio	Pennsylvania Shakespeare Festival
2007	The Taming of the Shrew, The Winter's Tale	Lucentio, Florizel	Pennsylvania Shakespeare Festival
2013	Measure for Measure	Claudio	Pennsylvania Shakespeare Festival
2015	Henry V, The Foreigner	Henry V, Rev. David Marshall Lee	Pennsylvania Shakespeare Festival

=== Video games ===
Year	Title	Role	Notes
2013	Grand Theft Auto V	Zimbor	Additional Motion Capture
