= Ruth Wallis =

American singer

- Born: Ruth Shirley Wohl; January 5, 1920; Brooklyn, New York, U.S.
- Died: December 22, 2007 (aged 87); South Killingly, Connecticut, U.S.
- Burial place: Sharon Memorial Park; Sharon, Massachusetts

Ruth Wallis (January 5, 1920 – December 22, 2007) was a novelty and cabaret singer. She sang with a studio orchestra and often took on an accent for songs about characters from other countries. Her music was occasionally featured on the Dr. Demento show in the 1970s.

== Background ==
A number of her recorded shows were released on the Australian Talent City label.

== Career ==
Born Ruth Shirley Wohl in the Brooklyn borough of New York City, Wallis began her career singing jazz and cabaret standards—with such bands as Isham Jones and Benny Goodman on road tours for a couple of months; but gained fame in the 1940s and 1950s for her risqué, satirical songs that she wrote herself, rife with double entendres.*

She started singing in lounges and cocktail bars, where she met her husband Hy Pastman. Eventually it became clear that her novelty songs, which relied mostly upon double entendres, were the most popular. These songs discussed a number of topics that were taboo in 1950s America, such as homosexuality and infidelity.

In 1953, she recorded a collection of saucy songs for the De Luxe label, including "Jose is Living the Life of Reilly" ("while Reilly is out of town!"). Later in the year, she wrote, sang, and published a mainstream novelty hit, "Dear Mr. Godfrey," a song about Arthur Godfrey's public firing of Julius La Rosa. Released in November 1953, it sold 100,000 within the first 10 days of release and reached #25 on the charts, launching Wallis on a whirlwind nightclub tour that same month.

Despite this mainstream exposure, Wallis recognized that her nightclub repertoire of risqué material was steadier and more lucrative. Frustrated by De Luxe's limited distribution of her works—and concerned about bootlegged copies for which she received nothing—she started her own record label, Wallis Original Recordings.

When she arrived in Australia for a tour in 1958, with songs like "The Admiral's Daughter" and "Johnny Had a Yo-Yo", customs agents seized her records. Rather than ruining her career, this only brought out crowds. It also created a healthy demand for her suppressed records, which were selling there at an extreme premium: $8 apiece. She was a regular headliner in Las Vegas nightclubs and lounges in the 1960s.

Wallis retired in the 1970s to spend more time with her husband and two children, but continued to work on material for Broadway shows. Some of her most famous songs were collected and became the Off-Broadway hit, BOOBS! The Musical: The World According to Ruth Wallis. BOOBS! opened at the Triad Theater in New York City on May 19, 2003; by closing date it had played nearly 300 performances. Produced and choreographed by Lawrence Leritz, it has had subsequent runs in New Orleans and Wichita.

In March 2007, Wallis was honored by the National Archives of Australia. Memorabilia of hers were included in 'Memory of a Nation', a permanent exhibition opening in Canberra.

Wallis died on December 22, 2007, in South Killingly, Connecticut, from complications of Alzheimer's disease.

== Track listing for Ruth Wallis' Greatest Hits – Boobs ==
1. "Queer Things"
2. "Boobs"
3. "Drill 'Em All"
4. "Ubangi"
5. "The Pistol Song"
6. "He'd Rather Be a Girl"
7. "Follies Bergere"
8. "Admiral's Daughter"
9. "Pizza"
10. "De Gay Young Lad"
11. "The Pop-Up Song"
12. "Cape Canaveral Blues"
13. "The Army Gave My Husband Back"
14. "The Dinghy Song" (often confused with a similar song, "Davy's Dinghy")
15. "Freddie the Fisherman's Song"
16. "Hawaiian Lei Song"
17. "The Same Little Yo-Yo"
18. "Marriage Jewish Style"
19. "The Bell Song"

== Wallis Original Records ==
Wallis Original Records was a record label which was started in 1952 by Joel Leibowitz and Hy Pastman to release records by Ruth Wallis, the "queen of the double entendre". Their last release was Ruth Wallis' Greatest Hits – Boobs on December 1, 1998.
