= Sorry for Your Loss =

American drama web television series

- Genre: Drama
- Created by: Kit Steinkellner
- Starring: Elizabeth Olsen; Kelly Marie Tran; Jovan Adepo; Mamoudou Athie; Janet McTeer; Zack Robidas
- Composer: Keegan DeWitt
- Country of origin: United States
- Original language: English
- No. of seasons: 2
- No. of episodes: 20

Production
- Executive producers: Robin Schwartz; Marc Turtletaub; Peter Saraf; Lizzy Weiss; Kit Steinkellner; Elizabeth Olsen; James Ponsoldt; Jon Liebman; Cynthia Pett; Brad Petrigala
- Producer: Molly Breeskin
- Cinematography: Xavier Grobet; Adam Bricker
- Editors: Darrin Navarro; Hilda Rasula; Crystal Lentz; Julie Cohen
- Camera setup: Single-camera
- Running time: 26–32 minutes
- Production companies: Starkeeper; Suzy B.; Brillstein Entertainment Partners; Big Beach

Original release
- Network: Facebook Watch
- Release: September 18, 2018 – November 19, 2019

Sorry for Your Loss is an American drama series created by Kit Steinkellner that premiered on September 18, 2018 on Facebook Watch. The series follows a young widow and her family as they struggle to cope with the unexpected death of her husband and stars Elizabeth Olsen, Kelly Marie Tran, Jovan Adepo, Mamoudou Athie, and Janet McTeer.

In December 2018, the series was renewed for a second season, which premiered on October 1, 2019. On January 16, 2020, Facebook Watch canceled the series after two seasons.

== Premise ==
Sorry for Your Loss follows "Leigh Shaw, a young widow who is forced to reassess her life and relationships following the death of her husband."

== Cast and characters ==
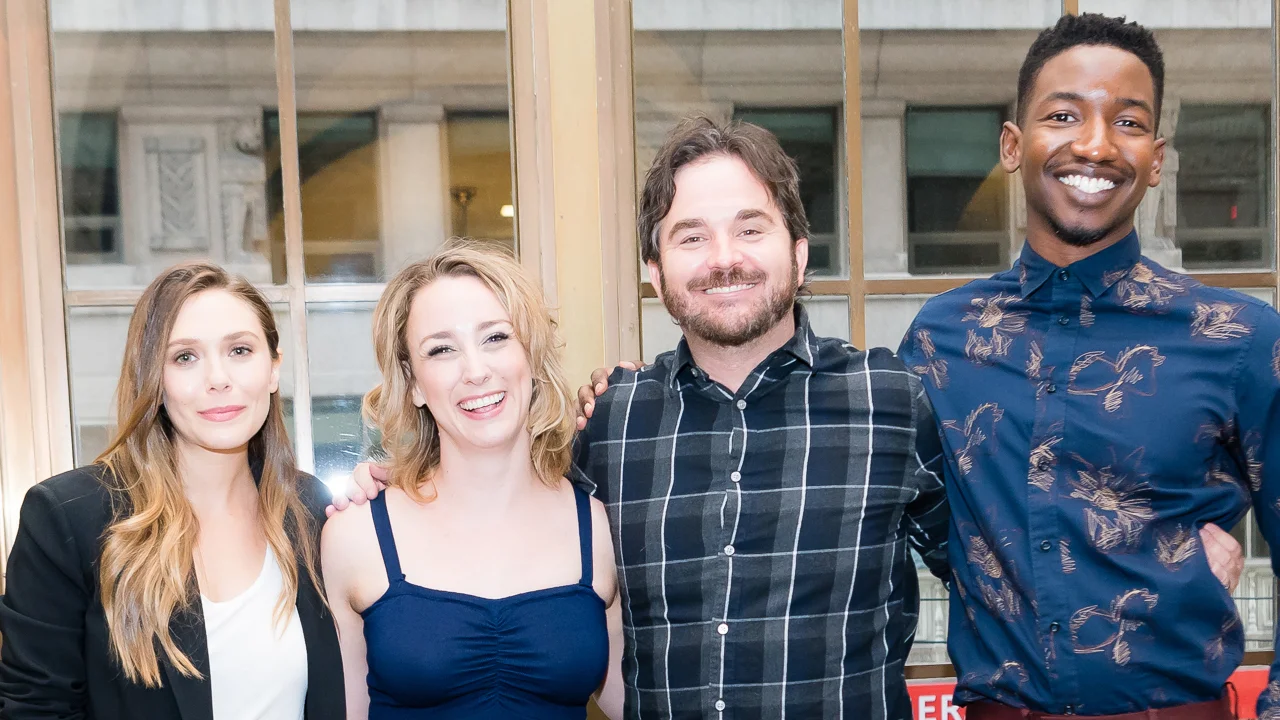
(L to R) Actress Elizabeth Olsen, writer/producers Kit Steinkellner and James Ponsoldt, actor Mamoudou Athie, interviewed at the Toronto International Film Festival by Collider in 2018

=== Main ===
- Elizabeth Olsen as Leigh Shaw, a writer and recently widowed woman. Following her husband's death, she quits her job writing an advice column for the website Basically News and moves in with her mother and sister. She currently works as an instructor at her mother's fitness studio, Beautiful Beast.
- Kelly Marie Tran as Jules Shaw, a recovering alcoholic and Leigh's adopted sister who also works at Beautiful Beast.
- Jovan Adepo as Danny Greer, Matt's brother with whom Leigh has always had an acrimonious relationship.
- Mamoudou Athie as Matt Greer, a high school English teacher and Leigh's late husband who possessed aspirations of becoming a comic book artist.
- Janet McTeer as Amy Shaw, Leigh and Jules's mother who owns and runs her own fitness studio, Beautiful Beast.
- Zack Robidas as Drew Burmester (recurring season 1, main season 2), the editor of the website Basically News, where Leigh had her advice column, and Leigh's best friend. He waits to tell Leigh about his engagement to his boyfriend Ryan as they became engaged right after Matt died.

=== Recurring ===
- Aisha Alfa as Claire, a woman who leads the grief counseling group that Leigh attends.
- Lyndon Smith as Lacey, an instructor at Beautiful Beast who has a rocky relationship with Jules.
- B.K. Cannon as Frankie, a close friend of Leigh's who became distant following Matt's death.
- Don McManus as Richard, Leigh's father and Amy's ex-husband. He reconnects with Amy after having been divorced for over twenty years.
- Carmen Cusack as Sabrina, Richard's wife with whom he has marital problems. She becomes closer with Jules as the two connect over their shared struggle with alcoholism.
- Ryan Reilly as Ryan, Drew's fiancée who was caught flirting with another man via text causing a rift in their relationship. The couple became engaged following Matt's death after coming to a realization about the brevity of life.
- Lauren Robertson as Becca Urwin, a new member of the grief counseling group whose husband died while serving in the US military in Afghanistan. She is new to Los Angeles and attempts to befriend Leigh after believing that they might have a lot in common but is immediately rebuffed. She and Leigh eventually connect during a visit to a spa where she reveals that she has been putting up a front in order to please other people by lying about her relationship with her late husband.
- LisaGay Hamilton as Bobby Greer, Matt and Danny's mother.
- Briana Venskus as Tommy, Jules's girlfriend.

=== Guest ===
- Poorna Jagannathan as Matt's psychiatrist ("17 Unheard Messages"), a psychiatrist who counsels Matt through his depression.
- Vic Chao as Joe Tsang ("17 Unheard Messages"), an editor at Flatland Ave Comics, a comic book publisher who decides to publish Matt's comic.
- Alexander Koch as Nicholas "The Schwab" Schwaback ("I Want a Party"), a former classmate of Leigh's from high school who had a crush on Amy.
- Jack De Sena as Ryan's College Friend ("A Widow Walks Into a Wedding"), a man whom Jules flirts with at Drew and Ryan's wedding.
- Daniel Vincent Gordh as Mike ("A Widow Walks Into a Wedding"), Ryan's brother.
- Luke Kirby as Tripp ("Welcome to Palm Springs"), the owner of the Palms Club Hotel who has a brief fling with Leigh when she stays at the hotel.
- Cleopatra Coleman as Simone ("I'm Here"), a woman Danny spends the day with.

== Episodes ==
=== Series overview ===
Season	Episodes	Originally released	
Season	Episodes	First released	Last released
1	10	September 18, 2018	October 9, 2018
2	10	October 1, 2019	November 19, 2019

=== Season 1 (2018) ===
No. overall	No. in season	Title	Directed by	Written by	Original release date
1	1	"One Fun Thing"	James Ponsoldt	Kit Steinkellner	September 18, 2018
During a grief counseling group meeting, advice columnist Leigh Shaw opens up about her husband Matt's recent death. After conducting a fitness class, Leigh talks with her sister Jules who asks her to pick up some clothes from her and Matt's apartment. Leigh tries to go but cannot make it through the front door. Later, she meets her friend and column editor Drew for lunch. He attempts to convince her to return to writing her column, which she left after Matt's death, and she agrees to consider it. At another counseling meeting, Leigh runs into Matt's brother Danny. While sitting in his car, they engage in an argument over who has suffered the greater loss with Matt's death. In a flashback, Leigh and Matt head over to Amy's house and are greeted by Jules who rushes to show them collage cards that Amy has made. Back at their apartment, Leigh asks Matt for help with a response she is writing for her advice column. Sometime later, Leigh awakens on her couch and notices that Matt is not yet home. She leaves to go look for him and eventually finds him in his car on the side of the road.
2	2	"Keep, Toss, Give Away"	James Ponsoldt	Kit Steinkellner	September 18, 2018
Leigh returns to the apartment she shared with Matt. She enlists Jules and her mother to help her clean out the apartment. Things are complicated when Matt's brother Danny arrives to claim some of Matt's possessions. Danny and Leigh fight over the comic book that Matt was working on. Realizing that she may not have known Matt as well as she thought, Leigh ultimately decides to give the book to Danny.
3	3	"Jackie O. and Courtney Love"	Jessica Yu	Lizzy Weiss	September 18, 2018
Leigh realizes she doesn't know the code to Matt's phone and keeps trying to unlock it. At grief group, she meets another young widow, Becca Urwin, a perky war widow who tries to befriend Leigh. After Becca comes to Beautiful Beast, Leigh ends up accidentally upsetting a different customer in an effort to make Becca uncomfortable leaving Jules to try to clean up her mess. After rudely telling Becca she doesn't want her friendship Leigh has second thoughts and apologizes to her. Becca reveals that her marriage was troubled and she maintains a facade so that people will like her.
4	4	"Visitor"	Allison Anders	Terrence Coli	September 18, 2018
While out jogging Leigh rescues a dog that wanders out into traffic. While searching for the dog's owners she nicknames the dog Visitor, as a reminder to her and Jules that the dog is only a temporary guest. Visitor triggers memories of Leigh's early courtship with Matt when he first confessed his depression and use of prozac and introduced her to his dog, Rogue. The memories make Leigh realize that Matt's passcode is the date of Rogue's death. Jules creates a new fitness class as Amy's plans to buy the building that Beautiful Beast is housed in and turn it into a wellness center, is thwarted by a group of investors with an all cash offer to buy the place.
5	5	"17 Unheard Messages"	James Ponsoldt	Jonathan Igla	September 25, 2018
Leigh finally gets to look at Matt's unlocked phone where she sees multiple unheard voicemails. In a flashback, we see that Matt was struggling heavily with depression that summer as he maxed out on his medication and needed to switch to a different prescription. Voicemails from Danny left-postmortem reveal that Matt died while hiking, and Danny becomes unsure whether his death was an accident or a suicide.
6	6	"I Want a Party"	Jamie Babbit	Elisa Lomnitz Climent	September 25, 2018
To Amy and Jules's shock Leigh is excited and happy on her birthday and decides she wants to celebrate the occasion with a large party, inviting over 600 of her Facebook friends. Before the party, she attempts to get her advice column back and learns that the writer who replaced her has made the column go viral several times. Despite asking for the party to be sober many people bring alcohol causing Jules to struggle. A high school classmate of Leigh's, the Schwab, arrives and hits on Amy after revealing he always had a crush on her. Leigh meanwhile confronts one of her best friends who disappeared when Matt died and tries to force Danny to admit that Matt likely killed himself.
7	7	"I Hate Chess"	Rose Troche	Story by : Danielle Henderson; Teleplay by : Destra Tedros Reff	October 2, 2018
Leigh wants to know more about Matt and his depression. Believing his childhood, which he never talked about, holds the answers to the origin of his depression she contacts first Danny and then her mother-in-law Bobby to look for answers. Her assumptions about Matt and his relationship with his father are turned on their head. Jules struggles with the 4th step of Alcoholics Anonymous and finds surprising comfort with Leigh's father's 2nd wife, Sabrina.
8	8	"A Widow Walks Into a Wedding"	Hannah Fidell	Corina Maritescu	October 2, 2018
Leigh, Jules, and Danny attend their friend Drew's wedding. An already difficult day quickly goes awry when Leigh bumps into the florist who made the centerpieces for her wedding and lies that Matt is out of town instead of revealing he's dead. Leigh ends up walking out of the ceremony, but Danny persuades her to come back. Meanwhile, Amy and Richard come together to talk about Jules and Sabrina's surprising friendship with strange results.
9	9	"Welcome to Palm Springs"	Azazel Jacobs	Lizzy Weiss	October 9, 2018
Leigh discovers that her father and Sabrina gifted her with a getaway in Palm Springs. Seeking to avoid Danny after they shared an intimate moment at Drew's wedding Leigh decides to run from her problems and spends the weekend at the hotel. While there she ends up flirting with a man who claims to be the owner of the hotel while Leigh pretends to be an international jewel thief.
10	10	"The Penguin and the Mechanic"	James Ponsoldt	Kit Steinkellner	October 9, 2018
Leigh is upset when she can't remember a joke that Matt told her. When she confides in Becca in group Becca advises her to go where the memories are. Leigh goes to her former apartment where the new tenant gives her mail including the proofs for Matt's graphic novel. When Leigh discovers that the publisher is still interested in publishing Matt's graphic novel provided that they are given the ending Leigh enlists Danny's help in finding any notes or sketches Matt left behind. In the course of their research, Danny and Leigh discover new things about the timeline of Matt's death that leads to further disagreements between them.

=== Season 2 (2019) ===
No. overall	No. in season	Title	Directed by	Written by	Original release date
11	1	"Middle Finger, Thumbs Up"	Azazel Jacobs	Kit Steinkellner	October 1, 2019
Leigh tries to move forward with her life, leading to a confrontation with Danny, who's made sweeping life changes.
12	2	"I'm Here"	Chinonye Chukwu	Etan Frankel	October 1, 2019
Leigh turns to Amy for a startling new way to connect with Matt. Danny is driven to take a huge risk by a total stranger.
13	3	"What's Wrong With Your Chest"	Ry Russo-Young	Sheila Callaghan	October 1, 2019
A family therapy session rocks Leigh, Jules, and Amy's worlds, leading to a Christmas dinner the Shaw family will never forget.
14	4	"Mr. Greer"	Hanelle Culpepper	Charles Yu	October 8, 2019
Leigh and Danny have different experiences returning to Matt's school for a memorial event.
15	5	"Norway"	James Ponsoldt	Kit Steinkellner	October 15, 2019
Danny takes Leigh on an all-night walk. Jules finds a surprising connection with the most unlikely ally.
16	6	"Weird Day"	Rose Troche	Corina Maritescu	October 22, 2019
Leigh goes on her first date since Matt died. Jules shows up at the wrong location for AA leading her on an adventure.
17	7	"Thirty Years"	Jenée LaMarque	Kimberly Ndombe	October 29, 2019
Leigh and Danny take a road trip, which forces them to confront their feelings about Matt… and each other.
18	8	"Drumroll, Please"	Millicent Shelton	Nathan Alan Davis	November 5, 2019
Leigh and Danny discover dangerous new fault lines in their dynamic, while Jules's feelings for Tommy are tested.
19	9	"The Whale"	Kat Candler	Sheila Callaghan	November 12, 2019
Danny has nightmares about his brother, Leigh can't write her essay until she gets the truth out of him. Tommy forces Jules to confront her fear.
20	10	"I'm Still Here"	James Ponsoldt	Kit Steinkellner	November 19, 2019

== Production ==
=== Development ===
Around 2013, playwright Kit Steinkellner initially devised the series after composing a writing sample that was inspired by a night when she had thought something terrible had happened to her husband. She proceeded to send that piece of writing to Robin Schwartz, a programming executive at the production company Big Beach, who liked Steinkellner's concept and had her draft a full script. By 2014, the production was set up at Showtime, then under the title Widow, where it languished in the development process over the ensuing years. Eventually, Big Beach was able to extract the series from the network and began to shop it to various streaming services and pay-cable television networks.

On February 9, 2018, it was announced that Facebook had given the production a straight-to-series order for a first season consisting of ten episodes. Steinkellner was set to executive produce the series alongside Schwartz, Elizabeth Olsen, Lizzy Weiss, James Ponsoldt, Marc Turtletaub and Peter Saraf, Cynthia Pett, Brad Petrigala, and Jon Liebman. Additionally, Weiss was expected to serve as the series' showrunner, Ponsoldt as the director of multiple episodes, and Avy Kaufman as the series' casting director. Production companies slated to be involved in the series included Big Beach TV, a subsidiary of independent film company Big Beach.

On March 1, 2018, it was announced that the series had been retitled Sorry for Your Loss and its central premise was revealed. On August 3, 2018, it was reported that the series would premiere on September 18, 2018. On December 13, 2018, it was announced that the series had been renewed for a second season.

=== Casting ===
Alongside the series order announcement, it was confirmed that Elizabeth Olsen had been cast in the series' lead role. On March 1, 2018, it was announced that Kelly Marie Tran had been cast in a series regular role. The following day, it was reported that Jovan Adepo had joined the main cast and that Janet McTeer and Mamoudou Athie were in talks for series regular roles. A week later, it was announced that McTeer and Athie had officially joined the cast.

=== Filming ===
Principal photography for the first season began on April 18, 2018 at CBS Studio Center in Los Angeles. On June 1, 2018, filming took place in Altadena, California. Filming occurred from June 5 to June 8, 2018 at the Parker Palm Springs hotel in Palm Springs, California.

== Release ==
Promotional poster featuring Elizabeth Olsen as Leigh Shaw.

=== Marketing ===
On August 13, 2018, a series of "first-look" images from the series were released. On August 28, 2018, the official trailer for the series was released.

=== Premiere ===
The series had its world premiere at the 2018 Toronto International Film Festival in Toronto, Ontario, Canada. The first four episodes of the series were screened, followed by a Q & A with creator Kit Steinkellner, Director James Ponsoldt, and stars Lizzie Olsen and Jovan Adepo as part of the festival's Primetime series of television screenings.

== Reception ==
=== Critical response ===
The series has been met with a positive response from critics upon its premiere. On the review aggregation website Rotten Tomatoes, the series holds a 93% approval rating, with an average rating of 7.58 out of 10 based on 30 reviews. The website's critical consensus reads, "Thoroughly honest and insightful, Sorry For Your Loss tackles a sensitive theme, but with a witty touch." Metacritic, which uses a weighted average, assigned the series a score of 83 out of 100 based on 12 critics, indicating "universal acclaim".

In a positive review, The Atlantic's Sophie Gilbert offered effusive praise describing the show as the "kind of series that's instantly so fully formed, so funny and candid and wrenching right from the start, that you almost question the emotional propriety of it all." Similarly enthusiastic, The Daily Beast's Kevin Fallon said of the series, "Sorry For Your Loss is a gem of a show. With a cast this impressive—in Olsen, an Avenger; in Tran, a Star Wars alum; in McTeer, a renowned Oscar nominee—a series this well-executed would ordinarily be a marquee entry in the fall TV season." In another favorable critique, Collider's Allison Keene commended the show saying, "Sorry for Your Loss is an intense, emotionally raw meditation on grief. And yet, it's never overwhelming as much as engrossing." In a further approving evaluation, Salon's Melanie McFarland commended the performances of the cast saying, "The feelings Olsen, Tran and the rest of the cast capture come across as true and natural, more affirming than depressing, a difficult balancing act to pull off in the most typical of dramas and in brighter months."

In a more mixed assessment, Slate's Inkoo Kang criticized the series saying, "Good intentions and all-around excellent performances can't make Sorry for Your Loss add up to the sum of its parts. Its keen sensitivity points to the dearth of grounded, relatable shows about loss, but falls short of filling that gap itself." In a negative review, IndieWire's Ben Travers gave the series a grade of "C−" and described it as, "little more than a meditation on death, offering a turgid reminder that the end is inescapable for us all and can be devastating for those we leave behind."

=== Awards and nominations ===
Year	Award	Category	Nominee(s)	Result	Ref.
2019	Critics' Choice Television Awards	Best Actress in a Drama Series	Elizabeth Olsen	Nominated	
2019	Shorty Awards	Best Web Series	Sorry for Your Loss	Nominated	

== See also ==
- List of original programs distributed by Facebook Watch
