= William Michals =

American stage actor and baritone singer (born 1965)

William Paul Michals
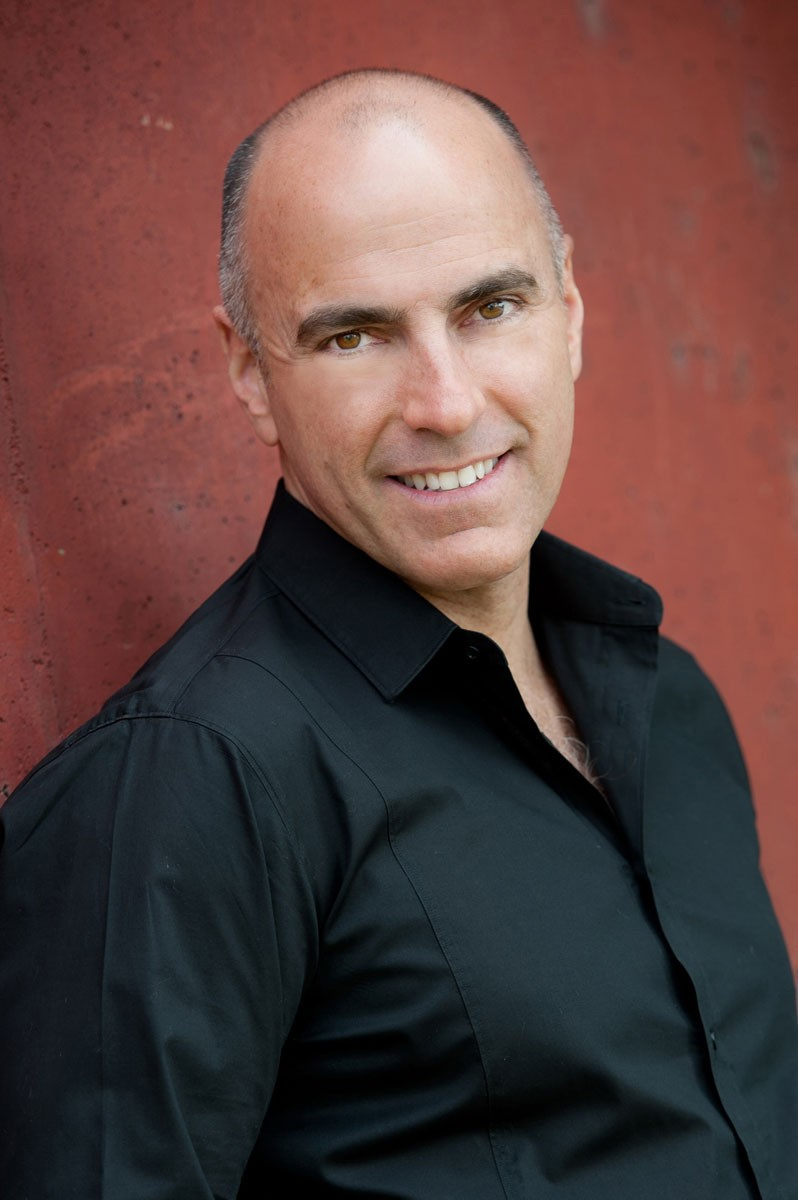
- Occupation: Actor
- Years active: 2007-present
- Website: williammichals.com

William Paul Michals is an American stage actor and baritone singer. He has appeared as Emile de Becque in Rogers and Hammerstein’s South Pacific at Lincoln Center. He made his Broadway debut as “The Beast” in Disney’s Beauty and the Beast, and later returned to play Gaston in the same production. His career continued with roles as Javert in Les Misérables, Billy Flynn in Chicago, Don Quixote in Man of La Mancha, Harold Hill in The Music Man, the title roles in The Phantom of the Opera and Sweeney Todd: The Demon Barber of Fleet Street, and recently appeared as Captain Hook in Leonard Bernstein's Peter Pan. He has received the Anselmo Award, he also earned recognition by Chicago’s “Jeff” and the National Star Awards for his portrayal of Chauvelin in a national tour of The Scarlet Pimpernel. He has played Captain von Trapp in The Sound of Music.

Michals regularly appears with the country’s leading orchestras, including the San Francisco, San Diego, Utah, and Hartford Symphonies, The New York Pops, and Philly Pops.

He has sung the national anthem for major league sporting events and has also performed for House and Senate inside the United States Capitol. He also sang at the December 11, 2001 memorial service at Ground Zero, singing "Let There Be Peace On Earth".

He has performed opera, in New York, Boston, and in concert at the Aspen and Tanglewood Music Festivals.

His moniker is “America's Baritone”.

== Broadway ==
- Beauty and the Beast (The Beast & Gaston)
- South Pacific (Emile De Beque)
- Parade (Detective J. N. Starnes, u/s Judge Roan/Old Soldier & Governor John Slaton)

== Other Live Theater and Opera ==
- Les Misérables (Javert)
- Phantom of the Opera (The Phantom)
- The Music Man (Harold Hill)
- Man of La Mancha (Don Quixote)
- Chicago (Billy Flynn)
- The Sound of Music (Captain von Trapp)
- Camelot (Lancelot)
- The Scarlet Pimpernel (Chauvlin)
- The Hunchback of Notre Dame (Dom Claude Frollo)

=== Opera ===
- Carmen (Escamillo)
- Le Nozze di Figaro (Figaro)
- Die Zauberflute (Papageno)

== TV ==
- Law and Order
- All My Children
- Guiding Light

== Live Theater ==
Other Broadway and Off-Broadway roles also include:

- 2011: South Pacific, lead role as "Emile de Becque", at the Pennsylvania Shakespeare Festival.
- 2012: Sweeney Todd: The Demon Barber of Fleet Street, lead role as "Sweeney Todd", at the Pennsylvania Shakespeare Festival.
- 2018: South Pacific, lead role as "Emile de Becque", at the Olney Theatre Center of the Arts in Olney Theatre - running from August 31 to October 7, 2018.
- 2019: Sunset Boulevard, starring as "Max von Mayerling", at the North Shore Music Theatre in Beverly, Massachusetts - running from september 24 to October 6, 2019.
