= Pennsylvania Shakespeare Festival =

American professional theatre company

Coordinates: 40.539944°N 75.373474°W

- Founded: 1992
- Founder: Gerard J. Schubert, O.S.F.S.
- Type: Arts
- Purpose: Quality, Shakespeare, Education, Relationships
- Location: Center Valley, Pennsylvania
- Region served: Pennsylvania, New Jersey, New York, Maryland, Delaware
- Product: Professional Theatre
- Managing Director: Casey William Gallagher
- Artistic director: Jason King Jones
- Employees: 12 year-round; 200+ seasonally
- Volunteers: 200
- Website: https://pashakespeare.org/

The Pennsylvania Shakespeare Festival (PSF) is a professional theatre company in residence at DeSales University in Center Valley, Pennsylvania and the official Shakespeare Festival of the Commonwealth of Pennsylvania.

The Festival is organized as a non-profit 501(c)(3) in Pennsylvania. Each summer, PSF produces six or more plays, including a musical, and special one-night-only performances. In the fall, PSF tours a Shakespeare play to schools as part of its Linny Fowler WillPower tour. Since its inception, the Festival has been attended by over 1,000,000 people. The acting company consists primarily of professional actors from New York and Philadelphia and who are members of Actors' Equity Association. The plays are performed in two theatres in The Labuda Center for the Performing Arts: the 473-seat proscenium Main Stage or the 187-seat thrust Schubert Theatre on the DeSales University campus in Center Valley.

Pennsylvania Shakespeare Festival is listed as a major festival in the book Shakespeare Festivals Around the World by Marcus D. Gregio (Editor), 2004.

== Productions ==
=== 2025 season ===
- Penelope - Music and Lyrics by Alex Bechtel • Book by Alex Bechtel, Grace McLean, and Eva Steinmetz • May 28 - June 8 • Schubert Theatre
- Mel Brooks' The Producers - Book by Mel Brooks and Thomas Meehan • Music and Lyrics by Mel Brooks • June 11 - June 29 • Main Stage
- A Raisin in the Sun - By Lorraine Hansberry • June 25 - July 13 • Schubert Theatre
- Hamlet - By William Shakespeare • July 9 - August 3 • Main Stage
- Rosencrantz and Guildenstern Are Dead - By Tom Stoppard • July 17 - August 2 • Main Stage
- Timon of Athens - By William Shakespeare • July 23 - August 3 • Schubert Theatre
- "Play On!" Community Tour Much Ado About Nothing - By William Shakespeare • May 30 - June 15 • Tour
- The Princess and The Frog Prince • By Jason King Jones • July 4 - August 2 • Schubert Theatre
- Shakespeare For Kids - By Erin Sheffield • July 23 - August 2 • Main Stage and Tour

=== 2024 season ===
- The Play That Goes Wrong - By Henry Lewis, Henry Shields, & Jonathan Sayer • May 29 - June 16 • Main Stage
- The Last Five Years - Written and Composed by Jason Robert Brown • June 12 - June 30 • Schubert Theatre
- The Merry Wives of Windsor - By William Shakespeare • June 26 - July 7 • Main Stage
- The Color Purple - Book by Marsha Norman • Music & Lyrics by Brenda Russell, Allee Willis, and Stephen Bray • July 17 - August 4 • Main Stage
- Cymbeline - By William Shakespeare • July 24 - August 4 • Schubert Theatre
- "Play On!" Community Tour The Comedy of Errors - By William Shakespeare • May 31 - June 16 • Tour
- Winnie-the-Pooh & Friends - Based on the classic stories from A.A. Milne • Adapted by Jason King Jones • July 5 - August 3 • Schubert Theatre
- Shakespeare For Kids - By Erin Sheffield • July 24 - August 3 • Main Stage

=== 2023 season ===
- Henry IV, Part 2 - By William Shakespeare • May 31 - June 11 • Schubert Theatre
- In the Heights - Music & Lyrics by Lin-Manuel Miranda; Book by Quiara Alegría Hudes; Conceived by Lin-Manuel Miranda • June 14 - July 2 • Main Stage
- The Complete Works of William Shakespeare (abridged) [revised] [again] - By Adam Long, Daniel Singer, Jess Winfield; New Revisions by Daniel Singer and Jess Winfield • June 28 - July 16 • Outdoor Stage
- The Tempest - By William Shakespeare • July 12 - August 6 • Main Stage
- Jane Austen's Sense and Sensibility - Adapted by Jessica Swale • July 20 - August 5 • Main Stage
- Lady Day at Emerson's Bar & Grill - By Lanie Robertson; Musical Arrangements by Danny Holgate • July 19 - August 6 • Schubert Theatre
- "Play On!" Community Tour A Midsummer Night's Dream - By William Shakespeare • June 2 - June 18 • Tour
- James and the Giant Peach - From the book by Roald Dahl; Dramatized by Richard R. George • July 7 - August 6 • Schubert Theatre
- Shakespeare For Kids - By Erin Sheffield • July 26 - August 5 • Main Stage

=== 2022 season ===
- Every Brilliant Thing - By Duncan Macmillan • June 7- June 19 • Schubert Theatre
- A Chorus Line - Conceived and Originally Directed and Choreographed by Michael Bennett; Book by James Kirkwood & Nicholas Dante; Music by Marvin Hamlish; Lyrics by Edward Kleban; Co Choreographed by Bob Avian • June 22 - July 10 • Main Stage
- Much Ado About Nothing - By William Shakespeare • July 13 - August 7 • Schubert Theatre
- Fences - by August Wilson - July 27-August 7 • Main Stage
- The River Bride (Staged Reading) - By Marisela Treviño Orta • July 1 - July 3 • Schubert Theatre
- Shakespeare For Kids - By Erin Sheffield • July 28 - August 6 • Main Stage
- Little Red - By Andrew Kane • June 3 - August 6 • Schubert Theatre

=== 2021 season ===
- Native Gardens - By Karen Zacharias
- How I Learned What I Learned- By August Wilson • June 29 - July 11 • Main Stage
- A Midsummer Night's Dream- By William Shakespeare • July 20 - August 1 • Air Products Open Air Theatre
- In Concert with Phoenix Best- July 12 • Air Products Open Air Theatre
- An Iliad - By Lisa Peterson and Denis O'Hare • July 7 - August 1 • Main Stage
- Love's Labour's Lost- By William Shakespeare (PSF Young Company) • July 24–25 • Air Products Open Air Theatre
- Charlotte's Web- By Joseph Robinette • June 25 - July 31 • Air Products Open Air Theatre

=== 2020 season ===
Pennsylvania Shakespeare Festival's 2020 season was scheduled to begin on May 29, 2020. On March 30, 2020, Pennsylvania Shakespeare Festival released a statement saying that the 2020 season would be cancelled due to the COVID-19 pandemic. PSF continued to engage with patrons through the "At Home with PSF" program which features interviews with artists, staff memories, and theatre resources.

=== 2019 season ===
- Crazy for You - Music and Lyrics by George and Ira Gershwin; Book by Ken Ludwig • June 12 - June 30 • Main Stage
- The Mystery of Irma Vep – A Penny Dreadful – By Charles Ludlam • June 20 - July 14 • Schubert Theatre
- Antony & Cleopatra - By William Shakespeare • July 10 - August 4 • Main Stage
- Private Lives - By Noël Coward • July 18 - August 4 • Main Stage
- Henry IV, Part 1 - By William Shakespeare • July 24 - August 4 • Schubert Theatre
- The Adventures of Robin Hood and Maid Marian - By Brandon E. McLauren • May 31 - August 3 • Schubert Theatre
- Shakespeare for Kids - By Erin Sheffield • July 24 - August 3 • Main Stage

=== 2018 season ===
- Ragtime - Book by Terrence McNally; Music by Stephen Flaherty; Lyrics by Lynn Ahrens; Based on the novel “RAGTIME” by E.L. Doctorow • June 13 - July 1 • Main Stage
- Twelfth Night – By William Shakespeare • June 21 - July 15 • Schubert Theatre
- Shakespeare in Love - Based on the screenplay by Marc Norman and Tom Stoppard; Adapted for the stage by Lee Hall; Music by Paddy Cunneen • July 11 - August 5 • Main Stage
- King Richard II - By William Shakespeare • July 19 - August 5 • Main Stage
- All's Well That Ends Well - By William Shakespeare • July 25 - August 5 • Schubert Theatre
- Alice in Wonderland - By Michele L. Vacca • June 1 - August 4 • Schubert Theatre
- Shakespeare for Kids - By Erin Sheffield • July 25 - August 4 • Main Stage

=== 2017 season ===
- Evita - Lyrics by Tim Rice; Music by Andrew Lloyd Webber • June 14 - July 2 • Main Stage
- The Hound of the Baskervilles – By Sir Arthur Conan Doyle; Adapted by Steven Canny & John Nicholson • June 21 - July 16 • Schubert Theatre
- The Three Musketeers - By Ken Ludwig; Adapted from the novel by Alexandre Dumas • July 12 - August 6 • Main Stage
- As You Like It - By William Shakespeare • July 20 - August 6 • Main Stage
- Troilus and Cressida - By William Shakespeare • July 26 - August 6 • Schubert Theatre
- The Ice Princess - By Brandon E. McLauren; Adapted from Hans Christian Andersen • June 2 - August 5 • Schubert Theatre
- Shakespeare for Kids - By Erin Sheffield • July 26 - August 5 • Main Stage

=== 2016 season ===
- West Side Story - Based on a conception of Jerome Robbins; Book by Arthur Laurents; Music by Leonard Bernstein; Lyrics by Stephen Sondheim; Entire original production directed and choreography by Jerome Robbins; Inspired by Shakespeare's Romeo and Juliet • June 15 - July 3 • Main Stage
- Julius Caesar – By William Shakespeare • June 22 - July 17 • Schubert Theatre
- The Taming of the Shrew - By William Shakespeare • July 13 - August 7 • Main Stage
- Blithe Spirit - By Noël Coward • July 21 - August 7 • Main Stage
- Love's Labour's Lost - By William Shakespeare • July 27 - August 7 • Schubert Theatre
- The Little Mermaid - By Linda Daugherty • June 3 - August 6 • Schubert Theatre
- Shakespeare for Kids - By Erin Sheffield • July 27 - August 6 • Main Stage

=== 2015 season ===
- Les Misérables - Boubil and Schonberg's musical based on the 1862 novel by Victor Hugo Les Misérables • June 10 - June 28 • Main Stage
- Around the World in 80 Days – By Mark Brown • June 17 - July 12 • Schubert Theatre
- The Foreigner (play) - By Larry Shue • July 8 - August 2 • Main Stage
- Henry V - William Shakespeare • July 16 - August 2 • Main Stage
- Pericles - By William Shakespeare • July 22 - August 2 • Schubert Theatre
- Rapunzel - Brothers Grimm fairy tale adapted by Erin Sheffield • May 29 - August 1 • Schubert Theatre
- Shakespeare for Kids - By Erin Sheffield • July 22 - August 1 • Schubert Theatre

== WillPower Tour ==
The Festival's signature education program is the annual Linny Fowler WillPower Tour, which brings a professionally produced Shakespeare play to middle schools and high schools throughout Pennsylvania, New Jersey, and Delaware. Initiated in 2000, the WillPower Tour is a professionally directed 80-minute production with sets and costumes featuring a company of professionally-trained and experienced actors and teachers. Half-day or full-day programming meet academic standards with curriculum guides provided in advance. Post-performance discussion gives students the opportunity to share their reactions and insights. Celebrating its 20th year, the fall 2019 WillPower Tour's production of Macbeth reached over 11,000 students in Pennsylvania and New Jersey.

== 'Play On!' Community Tour ==
Pennsylvania Shakespeare Festival’s 'Play On!' Community Tour brings accessible Shakespeare to neighborhoods throughout the Lehigh Valley. The production brings free performances of various Shakespeare plays to libraries, parks, and community centers all over the region. The 'Play On!' Tour is a professionally directed 80-minute production featuring PSF's Young Company, which consists of professionally trained and hired DeSales University Theatre students. The tour includes 14 different locations across Lehigh Valley and the surrounding counties, with an additional encore performance at PSF Community Day.

== Muse of Fire Project ==
The Muse of Fire Project, established in 2025, is an educational initiative that places high school students from across the Lehigh Valley at the center of a fully-realized Shakespeare production. This program offers local high school students the rare opportunity to perform on a professional stage while working alongside professional directors and artists.

== History ==
The Pennsylvania Shakespeare Festival was founded in 1992 by Gerard J. Schubert, O.S.F.S., founder and chair of Performing and Fine Arts department at DeSales University. PSF has offered 200+ total productions, produced 31 of Shakespeare’s 38 plays, plus musicals, world classics, contemporary comedies, dramas and children’s shows.

== Notable Actors ==
- Christian Coulson - 2018, King Richard, King Richard II; 2018, Lord Wessex, Shakespeare in Love
- Dan Domenech - 2017, Che, Evita
- Dee Roscioli - 2017, Eva Perón, Evita; 2012, Mrs. Lovett, Sweeney Todd: The Demon Barber of Fleet Street; 2010, Finale Cabaret
- Paulo Szot - 2017, Juan Perón, Evita
- Keith Hamilton Cobb - 2016, Julius Caesar, Julius Caesar (play)
- Kate Fahrner - 2015, Fantine, Les Misérables
- Rachel Potter - 2015, Eponine, Les Misérables
- Zack Robidas - 2015, Henry V, The Foreigner
- Steve Burns - 2013, Clown 1, The 39 Steps; 2011, Dromio of Syracuse, The Comedy of Errors; 2007, Amadeus, Amadeus
- Alexie Gilmore - 2013, Gwendolyn, The Importance of Being Earnest
- Tom Degnan - 2012, Brick, Cat on a Hot Tin Roof, Don John, Much Ado about Nothing
- William Michals - 2012, Sweeney Todd, Sweeney Todd: The Demon Barber of Fleet Street; 2011, Emile De Beque, South Pacific
- Marnie Schulenburg - 2011, Nellie Forbush, South Pacific; 2006, Celia, As You Like It, 2015 The Foreigner, Henry V
- Greg Wood - Numerous through 25 seasons.
