= Robert Hunt (actor) =

Robert Hunt is a U.S. stage actor who appeared in the 2008 production of Jerry Springer the Opera at Carnegie Hall. He also performed in the first Broadway revival of Les Misérables as Courfeyrac, Champmathieu, Factory Foreman, and later Javert. Off-Broadway, Hunt led the original cast of the hit Boobs! The Musical. Hunt played opposite Kelli O’Hara, in the 2007 Oklahoma state centennial production of Oklahoma!.

He also appeared in the original Broadway production of Les Misérables as Combeferre, the Factory Foreman, and other ensemble roles. He additionally understudied Javert.

Hunt's regional credits include Jekyll and Hyde in Jekyll & Hyde, Whizzer in Falsettos, Joe Hardy in Damn Yankees, Perchik in Fiddler on the Roof, Freddy Eynsford-Hill in My Fair Lady and Smudge in Forever Plaid.
