= Kit Steinkellner =

American playwright and screenwriter (born 1986)

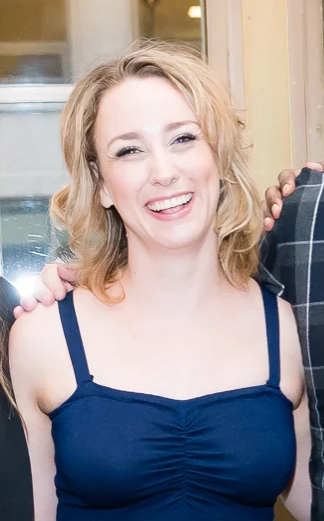
- Kit Steinkellner at the premier of Sorry for Your Loss at TIFF
- Born: 1986 (age 39–40); United States
- Occupations: Playwright, Screenwriter
- Writing career
- Years active: 2015–present
- Notable works: Play Quince (2014); TV series Z: The Beginning of Everything (2015); TV series Sorry for Your Loss (2018)

Kit Steinkellner (born 1986) is an American playwright and screenwriter. She is best known for the 2018 Facebook Watch series Sorry for Your Loss and her award-winning comic Quince. She previously wrote on the Amazon Studios period drama Z: The Beginning of Everything, and was nominated for the Dwayne McDuffie Award for Diversity in Comics in 2018.

== Background and education ==
Steinkellner, raised in Santa Barbara, California, graduated in 2004 from Dos Pueblos High School. She received her BFA in theatre from Westmont College in 2008, and her MFA from the UCLA School of Theater, Film and Television.

== Career ==
While at University of California, Los Angeles, Steinkellner began writing plays, culminating in the 2008 production of Quixotic by The Los Angeles Theatre Ensemble. Her plays Adeline's Play and The Good Prisoner were also produced by the prestigious troupe.

In 2015, she was hired as a staff writer on the Amazon Studios TV series Z: The Beginning of Everything. In 2016, she sold a pilot entitled Widow to Showtime. That pilot eventually became Sorry for Your Loss, which Facebook ordered to series on February 9, 2018, and premiere on their Facebook Watch platform on September 18, 2018.

On December 13, 2018, it was announced that Sorry for Your Loss had been renewed for a second season, with Steinkellner remaining as the show runner.
