= Erin Mackey =

American stage actress and singer (born 1986)

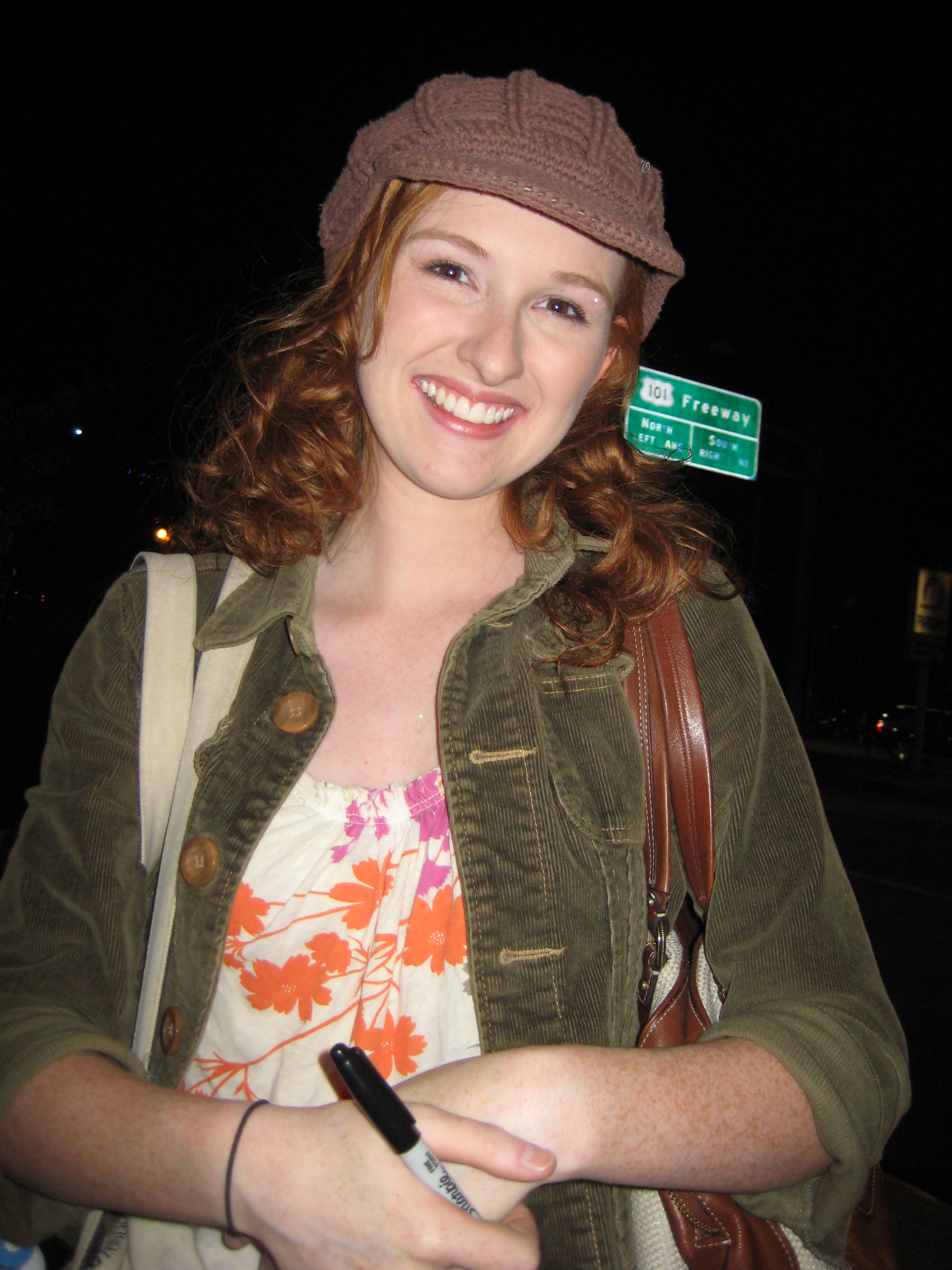
- Mackey in 2008
- Born: Erin Ashley Mackey; June 19, 1986 (age 40); Fullerton
- Occupations: Actress; singer
- Years active: 1997–present
- Spouse: Stanton Nash (m. 2009)

Erin Ashley Mackey (born June 19, 1986) is an American stage actress and singer, known for playing the role of Glinda in the Chicago, Los Angeles, Broadway, and Second National Tour productions of the musical Wicked. She was also a double for Lindsay Lohan in Walt Disney's The Parent Trap (1998).

== Career ==
Her first role was for Disney's The Parent Trap. In 1999, she played Jenna in "You're Invited to Mary-Kate & Ashley's Fashion Party".

She won a 2003 L.A. Music Center Spotlight Award for Non-Classical Voice.

In 2004, after graduating from Fullerton Union High School, she decided to continue to pursue her passion for theater, attending Carnegie Mellon University. From 2006 until 2010, she played the role of Glinda in various productions of the musical Wicked.

After Wicked, she starred in the new Broadway musical Sondheim on Sondheim, which began previews at Studio 54 on March 19, 2010, and officially opened on April 22. The show ended its limited engagement on June 27, 2010. She was also seen in the York Theatre production of I Remember Mama, which ran October 8–10, 2010.

In June 2011, Mackey played the role of Lucy Steele in the reading of a new musical based on Jane Austen's Sense & Sensibility. Mackey succeeded Laura Osnes as Hope Harcourt in the Broadway revival of Anything Goes on September 13, 2011.

Mackey originated the role of Oona O'Neill in the 2012 Broadway production of Chaplin. She played the role of Christine in the 2013 Pittsburgh CLO production of Phantom. Mackey's other theater include Clara Johnson in the 2014 South Coast Repertory Theatre production of The Light in Piazza, Johanna in the New York Philharmonic's March 2014 concert of Sweeney Todd: The Demon Barber of Fleet Street, and Ensign Nellie Forbush in the 2014 Paper Mill Playhouse, the 2016 Guthrie Theater, and 2020 Goodspeed Musicals productions of South Pacific. She starred as Mary Catlett in the world premiere of the musical, Amazing Grace from October to November 2014 playing a role she would later reprise on Broadway. From November 2016 through April 2017, Mackey starred on Broadway in the a cappella musical In Transit. She played Dot in the Guthrie Theater's 2017 production of Sunday in the Park with George. She then played Grace Farrell in the Paper Mill Playhouse production of Annie. In November 2022, she starred as Mrs. Phagan in the New York City Center gala presentation of Parade.

=== Wicked ===
After her first year of college, Mackey auditioned for the musical Wicked and was offered a role as a swing on the national touring production. After appearing on tour for several months, she was offered a role in the Chicago company as an ensemble member and understudy for the role of Glinda. After six months, she succeeded Stacie Morgain Lewis in the role on October 24, 2006. She starred opposite Kristy Cates and later Dee Roscioli in the co-lead role of Elphaba. She left the Chicago production at the end of her contract on April 13, 2008, and was replaced by Kate Fahrner. She then transferred to the Los Angeles production, replacing Megan Hilty as Glinda from May 20, 2008, and starred opposite Teal Wicks as Elphaba through September 28, 2008.

In her Broadway debut, she reprised the role of Glinda beginning August 11, 2009, replacing Alli Mauzey. She starred alongside former co-star Dee Roscioli as Elphaba. She gave her final performance as Glinda on January 10, 2010. She was succeeded by Katie Rose Clarke.

Nearly a decade after her final Broadway performance, Mackey again reprised the role of Glinda in the 2nd national tour of Wicked, with performances lasting from February 26, 2019, through September 22, 2019. She starred alongside her In Transit co-star Mariand Torres, who played Elphaba. She was succeeded by former Glinda understudy, Allison Bailey.

== Personal life ==
In 2009, she married former co-star Stanton Nash, who starred alongside her in Chicago as Boq.

== Acting credits ==
Film
Year	Title	Role	Notes
1998	The Parent Trap	Hallie/Annie Double	
1999	You're Invited to Mary-Kate & Ashley's Fashion Party	Jenna	Video
2000	Mad Song		
2002	Family Affair	Patricia	Episode: "No Small Parts"
2002	Do Over	Bonnie	Episode: "Halloween Kiss"
2003	Greetings from Tucson	Erica	Episode: "Ball and Chain"
2010	Blue Bloods	Rachel	Episode: "Re-Do"
2012	Gossip Girl	Casting Assistant	Episode: "Salon of the Dead"
2015	The Intern	Jane	
2016	CoExisting	Harriet	TV movie

Theatre
Year	Title	Role
2006–2010	Wicked	Swing, Ensemble, u/s Glinda, Glinda (v. productions)
2010	Sondheim on Sondheim	Performer
2011	Anything Goes	Hope Harcourt
2012	Chaplin	Oona O'Neill
2014	"Live from Lincoln Center" Sweeney Todd: The Demon Barber of Fleet Street	Johanna Barker
2014–2015	Amazing Grace	Mary Catlett
2016–2017	In Transit	Ali
2017	Sunday in the Park with George	Dot
2017	Annie	Grace Farrell
2019	Wicked	Glinda
