= Marnie Schulenburg =

American actress (1984–2022)

- Born: May 21, 1984; Cape Cod, Massachusetts, U.S.
- Died: May 17, 2022 (aged 37); Bloomfield, New Jersey, U.S.
- Education: DeSales University
- Occupation: Actress
- Years active: 2007–2022
- Known for: As the World Turns; One Life to Live; Tainted Dreams
- Spouse: Zack Robidas (m. 2013)
- Children: 1
- Website: marnieschulenburg.com

Marnie Schulenburg (May 21, 1984 – May 17, 2022) was an American actress who was known for her role as Alison Stewart on the CBS soap opera As the World Turns (2007–2010).

== Early life ==
Marnie Schulenburg was born in Cape Cod, Massachusetts and was of German descent. She had an older sister, Corinna, a playwright and an older brother, Allan, a music teacher. She graduated from Barnstable High School in 2002.

In May 2006, she graduated from DeSales University in Center Valley, Pennsylvania with a bachelor's degree in theater.

In September 2006, she moved to New York City and started auditioning for acting roles. She joined Dramatists Guild of America where she took part in play reading and also participated in The Flux Theatre Ensemble.

== Career ==
In 2006, Schulenburg was cast in the role of Alison Stewart; she made her debut when the character made a crossover appearance on The Young and the Restless on February 22, 2007, and later debuted on As the World Turns the following month. Schulenburg and actress Adrienne Frantz were featured in the mini online soap opera titled Digital Daytime: L.A.Diaries. Schulenburg remained with As the World Turns until its final episode on September 17, 2010, becoming the longest-tenured actor in the role of Alison. For her portrayal of Alison, Schulenburg earned a Daytime Emmy Award nomination in the category of Outstanding Younger Actress in a Drama Series in 2010. In April 2020, she appeared on a virtual cast reunion hosted by Alan Locher.

Schulenburg made her film debut in the romantic comedy Made for Each Other (2009). She had guest roles on the television shows Fringe, Divorce, Manhattan Love Story, Army Wives, Canterbury's Law, Elementary and Blue Bloods. She appeared in Amazon Prime Video's series Alpha House as Crystal in the last two episodes of its first season. Schulenburg played Sherry Tanner in three episodes of comedy-drama series Royal Pains. She appeared in the Pennsylvania Shakespeare Festival theater productions of As You Like It (2006) and South Pacific (2011). She appeared in the documentary film One Night Stand (2011) alongside Cheyenne Jackson, Jesse Tyler Ferguson and Rachel Dratch. The film follows the cast for 24 hours as they compose music, write a script and lyrics and learn lines, because the show will make its one night open and close at New York City's Gramercy Theatre.

In 2013, she was cast as Jo Sullivan on ABC's soap opera One Life to Live. In 2014, she began portraying ambitious actress Peyton Adams on Tainted Dreams that premiered on YouTube on December 30, 2013 and later moved exclusively to Amazon and Amazon Prime. Created by Sonia Blangiardo, it is a "soap-within-a-soap" that follows the backstage drama of the fictional soap opera Painted Dreams. In April 2019, she made a guest star appearance as Stacy on CBS's The Good Fight.

== Personal life ==
Schulenburg married her boyfriend of 10 years, actor Zack Robidas, on September 15, 2013. She gave birth to their daughter, Coda Jones on December 12, 2019.

=== Illness and death ===
In May 2020, Schulenburg revealed that she had been diagnosed with metastatic breast cancer, which doctors mistook for a mastitis diagnosis that is common to new mothers. She described her cancer as the "most insidious kind, inflammatory breast cancer which doesn’t look like typical breast cancer, more aggressive, affects younger women, and disguises itself as a breastfeeding infection." "How does one celebrate a birthday after a stage four breast cancer diagnosis in the middle of a global pandemic while raising a 5 month old?", she wrote in an Instagram post. Her friends and family members set up a GoFundMe page for her medical expenses and the goal of $75,000 was raised in October 2020. On May 17, 2022, she died from the disease at a hospital in Bloomfield, New Jersey, aged 37.

== Filmography ==
Film
Year	Title	Role	Notes
2009	Made for Each Other	Wing's Waitress	
2011	One Night Stand	Herself	Documentary film
2013	Penny Dreadful	Holly	Short film
2013	The Golden Scallop	Lindsay O'Hara	
2014	Don-o-mite	Secretary	Short film
2017	Digital Friends	Therapist	Short film

Television
Year	Title	Role	Notes
2007	The Young and the Restless	Alison Stewart	Episode: "Episode #1.8585"
2007–2010	As the World Turns	Alison Stewart	308 episodes Nominated–Daytime Emmy Award for Outstanding Younger Actress in a Drama Series (2010)
2007	Digital Daytime: L.A.Diaries	Alison Stewart	Web series
2008	Canterbury's Law	Annabeth Mills	Episode: "What Goes Around"
2009	Fringe	Mom	Episode: "Unleashed"
2010	Army Wives	Megan Meyer	Episode: "Scars and Stripes"
2010-2012, 2016	Royal Pains	Sherry Tanner	3 episodes
2011, 2012	Blue Bloods	Coreen	Episodes: "Whistle Blower" and "Lonely Hearts Club"
2013	Compulsive Love	Lucy	Episode: "Leena, Lucy and Lyssa"
2013	One Life to Live	Jo Sullivan	9 episodes
2014	Alpha House	Crystal	Episodes: "In the Saddle" and "Showgirls"
2014	Manhattan Love Story	Ann	Episode: "Let It Go"
2014–2017	Tainted Dreams	Peyton Adams	15 episodes
2015	Dog People	Liz	Episode: "Double Dog Standard"
2017	Elementary	Maureen	Episode: "Fly Into a Rage, Make a Bad Landing"
2019	Divorce	Dallas's Lawyer	Episode: "Knock Knock"
2019	The Good Fight	Stacy	Episode: "The One with Lucca Becoming a Meme"
2022	City on a Hill	Maggie Caysen	Recurring role, 6 episodes

Theater
Year	Title	Role	Venue
2006	As You Like It	Celia	Pennsylvania Shakespeare Festival
2009	Pretty Theft (play)	Lucy	Flux Theatre Ensemble
2011	South Pacific	Nellie	Pennsylvania Shakespeare Festival
2012	Hearts Like Fists (play)	Lisa	Flux Theatre Ensemble
2017	Marian, or the True Tale of Robin Hood (play)	Lucy	Flux Theatre Ensemble
