= Chuck Gloman =

American academic author and professor

Chuck Gloman is an American academic author and professor. He is the ex-department chair of the television and film program at DeSales University in Center Valley, Pennsylvania.

== Career ==
Film

Gloman has created over 900 television commercials, 250 corporate videos, and 100 documentary films as a cinematographer and film producer. In 2013, he wrote and produced the short film, You're an Angel, which won the award for Viewer Impact: motivational/inspirational at the 2013 Indie Fest, and an Award of Excellence at the 2013 International Film Festival for Spirituality, Religion, and Visionary. His 2013 film, So Pretty To Look At, was shown in the 2013 Greater Lehigh Valley Filmmaker Festival. His movie The Hunted was screened at Movies at the Mill, a film festival in Easton, Pennsylvania.

Writing

He has written four textbooks and over 300 articles as a contributing editor for Digital Video, TV Technology and Government Vide] magazines.

== Published works ==
- Gloman, Chuck (2002). No-Budget Digital Filmmaking, McGraw-Hill/TAB Electronics, 317 pages. ISBN 978-0071412322
- LeTourneau, Tom; and Chuck Gloman (2005). Placing Shadows: The Art of Video Lighting, Focal Press, 304 pages. ISBN 978-0240806617
- Pescatore, Mark J.; and Chuck Gloman (2006). Working with HDV, Shoot, Edit, and Deliver Your High Definition Video, Focal Press, 256 pages. ISBN 978-0240808888
- Napoli, Rob; and Church Gloman (2006). Scenic Design and Lighting Techniques, A Basic Guide for Theatre, Focal Press, 416 pages. ISBN 978-0240808062
