= Boobs! The Musical =

- The World According to Ruth Wallis
- Music: Ruth Wallis
- Lyrics: Ruth Wallis
- Book: Steve Mackes; Michael Whaley
- Premiere: May 19, 2003: Triad Theater
- Productions: 2000 Off-Broadway workshop 2003 Off-Broadway; 2004 New Orleans; 2005 Wichita, Kansas; 2017 Hamilton, New Zealand

Boobs! The Musical: The World According to Ruth Wallis is a musical revue with lyrics and music by 1950s and 1960s star Ruth Wallis. Using 20 of Wallis' songs, Boobs! tells the story of Ruth Wallis' international career and struggles in performing her naughty songs. Boobs! The Musical opened at the Triad Theater in New York City on May 19, 2003, to critical praise.

The New York Times review noted that Boobs! The Musical "exudes a joyous innocence" and featured "a lot of talent onstage. The six-person cast, which also includes the talented and good-looking Kristy Cates and Robert Hunt, is expertly directed by Donna Drake and choreographed by Lawrence Leritz." Boobs! eventually transferred to Dillon's Reprise Room; by closing date it had played nearly 300 performances. It had subsequent long runs in New Orleans, Louisiana, in 2004, and in Wichita, Kansas, in 2005, with international productions beginning in New Zealand 2017. Broadway vets Lawrence Leritz was producer/choreographer and Donna Drake, director. Also notable were the costumes by J. Kevin Draves and Robert Pease and set by two-time Emmy award-winning set designer Eric Harriz. The book adaptation was written by Steve Mackes and Michael Whaley.

Boobs! originally had a workshop at The Pulse Ensemble Theatre on the Off Broadway 42nd Street Theatre Row in December 2000. Various notable cast members from the three New York productions included J. Robert Spencer, Jenny-Lynn Suckling, Robert Hunt, Kristy Cates, Clyde Alves, Alena Watters, Brad Bradley, Tony Falcon, Benjie Randall, David Villella and the New York theatre debut of Gennifer Flowers.

== Musical numbers ==
- Boobs!
- Queer Things Are Happening
- The Dingy Song
- Man Of My Own
- All The Clowns
- Pizza Every Night
- Johnny's Yo Yo
- Ugly Man With Money
- I Know
- Love Is For The Birds
- Drill 'Em All
- Always Be A Bride

== Awards and nominations ==
- 2004 Mac Awards Best Musical Revue (Lawrence Leritz, nominee)
- 2005 Big Easy Awards Best Musical (Lawrence Leritz, All Kinds of Theatre, nominees)
- 2005 Big Easy Awards Best Costumes (Winner, Cecile Casey Covert, based on original designs by Robert Pease and J. Kevin Draves)
- 2005 Big Easy Awards Best Musical Director (Harry Mayronne, nominee)
- 2005 Big Easy Awards Best Director (Carl Walker, nominee)
- 2005 Ambie Awards Best Ensemble Cast (Winners: Becky Allen, Maureen Brennan, Bob Edes Jr., Ann Mahoney, Robert Thomas, Chris Wecklein)
- 2006 Teall Awards Best Musical (Lawrence Leritz, Cabaret Oldtown, nominees)
- 2006 Teall Awards Best Choreography (nominee, based on original choreography by Lawrence Leritz)

== Sources ==
- Jones, Kenneth (July 30, 2003). "Boobs! The Musical Bustin' Out All Over; Cast Album, Regional Runs Expected", Playbill.
- Simon, John (August 11, 2003). "Edge – Boobs! – Judy Speaks", New York Magazine.
- Gates, Anita (May 29, 2003). "THEATER REVIEW; She Doesn't Need Her Vocal Chords to Sing , The New York Times.
- Jones, Kenneth (Dec. 19, 2003) "Boobs! The Musical Busts Its Way Into NYC Theatre District Dec. 19; Clyde Alves Joins Cast" https://web.archive.org/web/20080920035044/http://www.playbill.com/news/article/83375.html Playbill
