= Sondheim on Sondheim =

2010 musical revue of songs by Stephen Sondheim

- Broadway cast recording
- Music: Stephen Sondheim and others
- Lyrics: Stephen Sondheim
- Book: James Lapine
- Productions: 2010 Broadway; 2012 Cleveland; 2014 Australia; 2015 San Diego; 2018 San Jose; 2023 London
- Awards: Drama Desk Award for Outstanding Musical Revue; Drama League Award for Outstanding New Broadway Musical

Sondheim on Sondheim is a musical revue consisting of music and lyrics written by Stephen Sondheim for his many shows. It is conceived and directed by James Lapine. The revue had a limited run on Broadway in 2010.

== Background ==
The revue is based on a show titled Moving On devised by David Kernan, and produced in 2000 (Kernan also conceived Side By Side By Sondheim). Moving On ran at the Bridewell Theatre, London, for 32 performances from July 19 to August 19, 2000. The show featured some narration recorded by Sondheim; a CD of the show was released but did not include the Sondheim narrations. In 2001, Moving On premiered in the U.S. at The Laguna Playhouse in California. David Kernan repeated his roles as conceiver and director. Three Sondheim vets, Teri Ralston (Company), Ann Morrison (Merrily We Roll Along) and David Engel (Putting It Together), led the revue with Christopher Carothers and Tami Tappan also in the cast.

Under a new title, Opening Doors, the show had several performances in New York at Carnegie Hall's Zankel Hall in September and October 2004.

Lapine conceived a version of the revue in 2008, titled Sondheim: a Musical Revue, to help celebrate the 40th anniversary of Alliance Theatre company in Atlanta, Georgia. This was structured as a multimedia revue, incorporating "original and archival commentary" from Sondheim. The revue was promoted as taking audience members "to the very heart of Sondheim's life and work." The production was canceled when producers failed to raise sufficient funding to cover expensive and "extensive technical requirements for film and multi-media projection" during a major recession.

== Productions ==
The Roundabout Theatre presented the revue, now titled Sondheim on Sondheim, at its Broadway venue, Studio 54, in a limited engagement. Previews started March 19, 2010, with the official opening on April 22 and closing on June 27, 2010.

The original Broadway cast featured Barbara Cook, Vanessa L. Williams, Leslie Kritzer, Erin Mackey, Tom Wopat, Norm Lewis, Euan Morton and Matthew Scott. Choreography was by Dan Knechtges, music direction and vocal arrangements by David Loud, sets by Beowulf Boritt, costumes by Susan Hilferty, lights by Ken Billington and projections by Peter Flaherty.

The Australian production of Sondheim on Sondheim, produced by theatre company Squabbalogic opened in October 2014 at Sydney's Seymour Centre. The production starred Blake Erickson, Rob Johnson, Louise Kelly, Debora Krizak, Phillip Lowe, Monique Sallé, Christy Sullivan, and Dean Vince.

A concert was presented at the Hollywood Bowl on July 23, 2017. The production was directed by original director James Lapine's niece Sarna, who had recently staged a Broadway revival of Sunday in the Park with George, and was backed by the Los Angeles Philharmonic with conductor Gustavo Dudamel and the Youth Orchestra Los Angeles. The cast featured Sarah Uriarte Berry, Phillip Boykin, Lewis Cleale, Carmen Cusack, Claybourne Elder, Jesse Tyler Ferguson, Jonathan Groff, Ruthie Ann Miles, Solea Pfeiffer, and Vanessa Williams.

A limited run was held in San Jose, California from January 18 to February 4, 2018 at 3Below Theaters. This limited run served as the inaugural production of 3Below Theaters and was produced and directed by Scott Guggenheim and Shannon Guggenheim.

In July 2023, the show was revived at its original home of the Bridewell Theatre by London's leading amateur theatre group, Sedos. This was the first time the show has been performed in the venue since it was originally conceived by Kernan in 2000 as well as the first performance of Sondheim on Sondheim in the UK since the composer's death in 2021.

== Concept ==
The musical features taped interviews with Sondheim. The songs, including well-known, less-known and cut material, are from nineteen Sondheim shows (including student shows) produced over a 62-year period, including several songs each from West Side Story, Company, Follies, A Funny Thing Happened on the Way to the Forum, Sunday in the Park with George, Merrily We Roll Along, Passion, and Into the Woods. Songs from his school years are included.

Lapine describes the revue as "a kind of impressionistic view of him that’s put together with pieces of archival footage and interview footage. It’s a collage of his life, in which who he is and how he got there comes in to focus." The show uses about 64 plasma screens.

== Musical Numbers ==
List of shows represented, and songs performed, in the revue:

- By George (1946), performed at the George School: "I’ll Meet You at the Donut"
- Saturday Night (1954), unproduced until 1997, book by Julius J. Epstein and Philip G. Epstein: "So Many People"
- West Side Story (1957), music by Leonard Bernstein, book by Arthur Laurents

"Something's Coming"
"Like Everybody Else" ‡

- Gypsy (1959), music by Jule Styne, book by Arthur Laurents: "Smile, Girls" ‡
- The Frogs (1974) A Funny Thing Happened on the Way to the Forum (1962): "Invocation/Forget War"
- A Funny Thing Happened on the Way to the Forum (1962), book by Burt Shevelove and Larry Gelbart

"Love Is in the Air" ‡
"Comedy Tonight"

- Anyone Can Whistle (1964), book by Arthur Laurents: "Anyone Can Whistle"
- Do I Hear a Waltz? (1965), music by Richard Rodgers, book by Arthur Laurents: "Do I Hear a Waltz?"
- Evening Primrose (1966), originally broadcast November 16, 1966; written by John Collier & James Goldman for the television series ABC Stage 67: "Take Me to the World"
- Company (1970), book by George Furth

"You Could Drive a Person Crazy"
"The Wedding Is Off" ‡
"Multitudes of Amys" ‡
"Happily Ever After" ‡
"Being Alive"
"Company"

- Follies (1971), book by James Goldman

"Ah, But Underneath” (London Production, 1987)
"Waiting for the Girls Upstairs"
"Losing My Mind"
"In Buddy’s Eyes"

- A Little Night Music (1973), book by Hugh Wheeler

"My Husband the Pig" ‡
"Every Day a Little Death"
"Send in the Clowns"
"A Weekend in the Country"

- Sweeney Todd: The Demon Barber of Fleet Street (1979), book by Hugh Wheeler

"Epiphany"

- Merrily We Roll Along (1981), book by George Furth

"Franklin Shepard, Inc."
"Good Thing Going"
"Now You Know"
"Opening Doors"
"Not a Day Goes By"
"Old Friends"

- Sunday in the Park with George (1984), book by James Lapine

"Finishing the Hat"
"Sunday"
"Beautiful"

- Into the Woods (1987), book by James Lapine

"Children Will Listen"
"Ever After"

- Assassins (1990), book by John Weidman

"Something Just Broke"
"The Gun Song"

- Passion (1994), book by James Lapine

"Fosca’s Entrance (I Read)"
"Is This What You Call Love?"
"Loving You"
"Happiness"

- Road Show (2008), book by John Weidman, formerly titled Bounce (2003)

"Talent"
"The Best Thing That Ever Has Happened"

‡ Cut from the original production of the show

Sondheim wrote a new song for this revue, titled God, a "self-deprecating comic song" sung by the company to open Act 2.

List of shows represented, collaborators, songs performed and the actors singing the parts, in order, on the cast album:

Act I:

"My Name Is Stephen Joshua Sondheim…" (Stephen Sondheim)

"Invocation"/"Forget War" (from The Frogs/A Funny Thing Happened On The Way To The Forum) (1974/1962) ("Sondheim On Sondheim" Company)
"Love Is In The Air" (from A Funny Thing Happened On The Way To The Forum) (Barbara Cook, Leslie Kritzer, Erin Mackey & Vanessa Williams)
"Comedy Tonight" (from "A Funny Thing Happened On The Way To The Forum") ("Sondheim On Sondheim" Company)
"Take Me To The World" (from Evening Primrose) (1966) (Cook)

"…Ten Years After I Was Born…" (Sondheim)

"Talent"/"When I Get Famous" (from Road Show/Climb High) (2008/1952) (Matthew Scott, Mackey)
"Something's Coming" (from West Side Story) (1957) (Leonard Bernstein/Sondheim) (Scott, Euan Morton, Kritzer, Mackey)

"…My First Professional Show…" (Sondheim)

"So Many People" (from Saturday Night) (1954) (Williams, Norm Lewis)

"…For Many Years, Hal Prince…" (Sondheim)

"You Could Drive A Person Crazy" (from Company) (1970) (Tom Wopat, Cook)
"The Wedding Is Off" (from Company) (Mackey, Williams)
"Now You Know" (from Merrily We Roll Along) (1981) (Kritzer, Mackey, Williams, Cook)

"…Hal Prince and I Did Six Shows Together…" (Sondheim)

"Franklin Shepard, Inc." (from Merrily We Roll Along) (Morton, Williams, Scott)
"Good Thing Going" (from Merrily We Roll Along) (Williams)

"…Sometimes, A Song Changes Its Shape…" (Sondheim)

"Waiting for the Girls Upstairs" (from Follies) (1971) ("Sondheim On Sondheim" Company)
"The Best Thing That Has Ever Happened" (from Road Show) (Wopat, Williams, Scott, Lewis)

"…My First Serious Relationship…" (Sondheim)

"Happiness" (from Passion) (1994) (Mackey, Scott)
"Fosca's Entrance (I Read)" (from Passion) (Cook, Lewis)
"Is This What You Call Love?" (from Passion) (Lewis)
"Loving You" (from Passion) (Cook)

Act II:

"God" * ("Sondheim On Sondheim" Company) (*new song written for revue)

"…If You Ask Me To Write A Love Song…" (Sondheim)

"Losing My Mind"/"Not A Day Goes By" (from Merrily We Roll Along) (Williams, Cook)

"…A Lot Of People Think…" (Sondheim)

"Opening Doors" (from Merrily We Roll Along) (Scott, Morton, Kritzer, Wopat, Cook, Mackey)

"…We Had Three Endings To Company…" (Sondheim)

"Multitudes of Amys" (from Company) (Scott)
"Happily Ever After" (from Company) (Wopat)
"Being Alive" (from Company) (Lewis, Morton, Scott, Wopat, Kritzer, Mackey)
"Something Just Broke" (from Assassins) (1990) (Mackey, Morton, Kritzer, Scott, Lewis)
"The Gun Song" (from Assassins) (Wopat, Scott, Morton, Kritzer)

"…Jule Styne and I realized with Gypsy…" (Sondheim)

"Smile, Girls" (from Gypsy) (1959) (Williams, Kritzer, Lewis, Morton) (Jule Styne, Sondheim)

"…I Suppose If There Is One That's Closest…" (Sondheim)

"Finishing The Hat" (from Sunday In The Park With George) (1984) (Wopat)
"Beautiful" (from Sunday In The Park With George) (Cook, Morton)

"…I Had A Lot of Trouble With My Mother…" (Sondheim)

"Children Will Listen" (from Into The Woods) (1987) (Mackey, Morton, Kritzer, Scott, Wopat, Williams)

"…To Me, Teaching Is A Sacred Profession…" (Sondheim)

"Send In The Clowns" (from A Little Night Music) (1973) (Cook)

"…I've Often Been Asked Why I Don't Write…" (Sondheim)

"Company"/"Old Friends" (from Company/Merrily We Roll Along) ("Sondheim On Sondheim" Company)
"Anyone Can Whistle" (from Anyone Can Whistle) (1964) ("Sondheim On Sondheim" Company)

== Response ==
The show met with mixed reviews. Most critics were in agreement that the video footage of Sondheim was the highlight of the show, that the technical aspects of the show were expertly handled and that some performances were good (notably Cook, Williams and the supporting cast). Negative reviewers tended to feel that the show was not as substantial as it could have been, that some material was poorly chosen or ill-matched to the performers, and that some performances were not successful (notably Wopat).

Ben Brantley in The New York Times wrote that the revue is "a genial, multimedia commemorative scrapbook on the life, times and career" of Sondheim, with "a polished and likable eight-member cast."

== Recording ==
The original cast recording was released on August 31, 2010.

== Awards and nominations ==
=== Original Broadway production ===
Year	Award Ceremony	Category	Nominee	Result
2010	Tony Award	Best Featured Actress in a Musical	Barbara Cook	Nominated
2010	Tony Award	Best Sound Design	Dan Moses Schreier	Nominated
2010	Drama Desk Award	Outstanding Musical Revue		Won
2010	Outer Critics Circle Award	Outstanding New Broadway Musical		Nominated
2010	Outer Critics Circle Award	Outstanding Actress in a Musical	Barbara Cook	Nominated
2010	Outer Critics Circle Award	Outstanding Set Design	Beowulf Boritt	Nominated
2010	Outer Critics Circle Award	Outstanding Lighting Design	Ken Billington	Nominated
2010	Drama League Award	Outstanding New Broadway Musical		Won
2010	Drama League Award	Outstanding Production of a Musical		Won
2011	Grammy Award	Best Musical Theater Album	Philip Chaffin & Tommy Krasker (producers)	Nominated

== See also ==
- Putting It Together
