= Dillon's Reprise Room =

Coordinates: 40.764435°N 73.98337°W

Dillon's Reprise Room, is a cabaret, located on West 54th Street in Manhattan's Theater District. Over the years, Dillons has been home to successful musical runs of "Our Sinatra," "The Water Coolers," and most recently "Boobs! The Musical," as well as some of cabaret's top performers.
