= Dee Roscioli =

American singer and actress (born 1977)

Danielle Roscioli
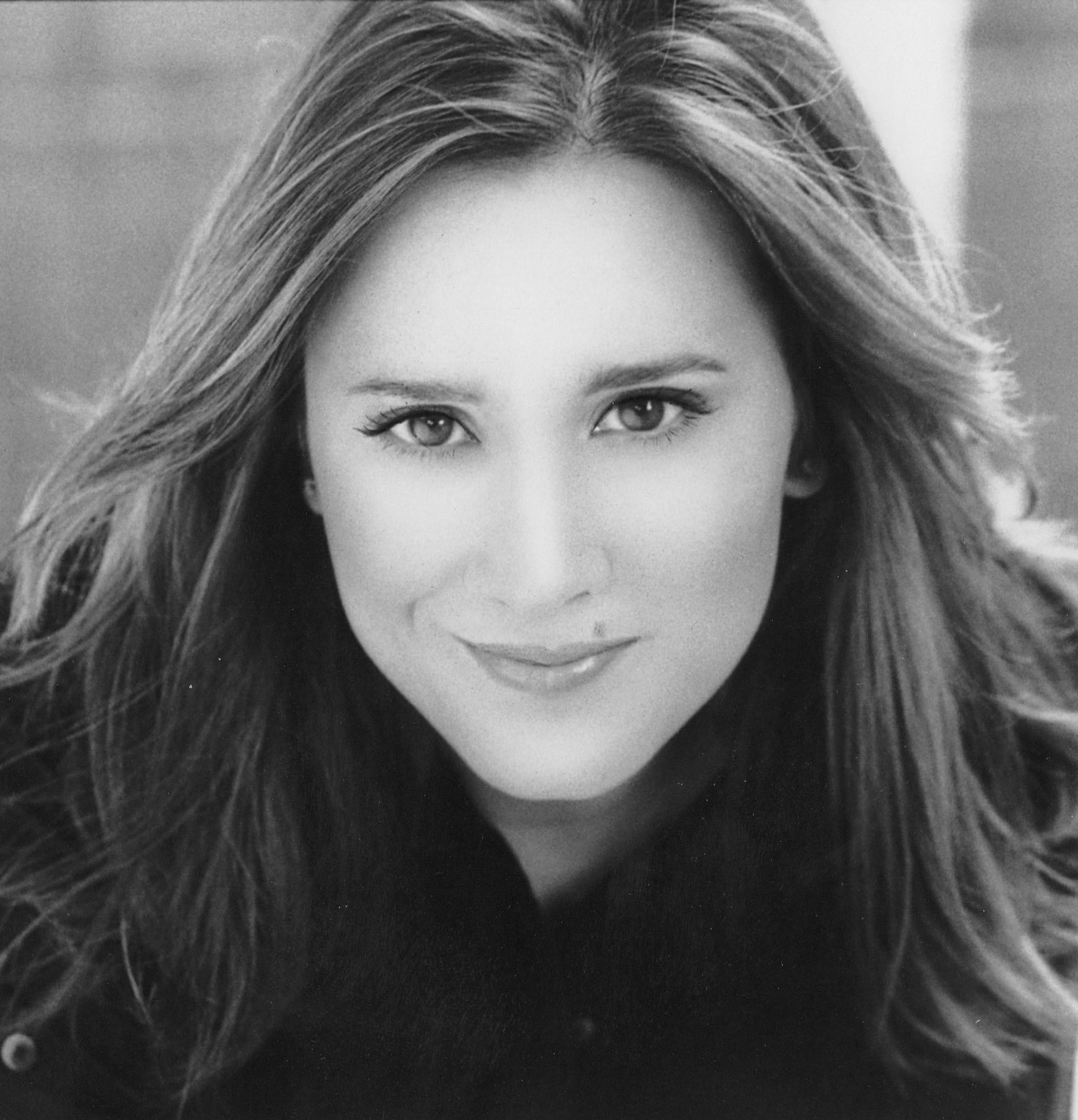
- Born: Danielle Marie Roscioli; July 20, 1977 (age 49); Easton, Pennsylvania, U.S.
- Education: DeSales University (1999)
- Occupations: Singer, stage actress
- Years active: 2000–present

Danielle Marie Roscioli (born July 20, 1977) is an American singer and actress, who is known for her performances as Elphaba in the Broadway, Chicago, San Francisco, and national touring productions of the musical Wicked.

== Early life and education ==
Roscioli was born on July 20, 1977, in Easton, Pennsylvania. In 1995, she graduated from Wilson Area High School in Easton. At Wilson High School, she competed in track and field, hockey, and was involved in chorus, SADD, student council, and yearbook. She was a peer helper, new student guide, a member of homecoming court, and qualified for district chorus. For all four years of high school, she participated in drama, and her yearbook states her plans were to attend a four-year college and major in theater.

She attended DeSales University in Center Valley, Pennsylvania, where she graduated in 1999. While at DeSales, she performed in Act One's production of The Music Man as Marian Paroo and as the beggar woman in Sweeney Todd: The Demon Barber of Fleet Street.

== Career ==
From 2000 to 2001, Roscioli originated a lead role in a national touring production of Pokémon Live! as Delia Ketchum and also contributed to the soundtrack in songs such as "I've Got a Secret" and "Everything Changes".

Roscioli was cast in the principal role of "Grizabella" in a national tour of Andrew Lloyd Webber's musical Cats from 2002 to 2003 and received critical acclaim for her performance.

In 2003, she participated in the off-Broadway US debut of George Gershwin's Primrose which was presented in a concert format.

In 2005, she played "Audrey" in Little Shop of Horrors at Northern Stage. She also participated in the workshop sessions of Behind the Limelight and Dangerous Beauty in New York City.

After leaving Wicked, Roscioli worked on a new musical called Liberty: A Monumental New Musical. In this show, she played the lead, "Liberty".

In late June 2010, Roscioli performed in a sold-out cabaret show Decidedly Dee at the jazz club Birdland. She also performed in the musical Therapy Rocks at Urban Stages in New York in September and October 2010.

Roscioli took part in the reading of the new musical, Welcome to My Life on April 11, 2011.

Roscioli took part in Interart Theatre and Royal Family Production's performance of Gary Duggan's Dedalus Lounge, which began, January 8, 2012, at the Interart Theatre Annex in Manhattan, playing the part of Delphine.

Roscioli performed at the 2012 Pennsylvania Shakespeare Festival at DeSales University. She played the part of Mrs. Lovett in the award-winning musical Sweeney Todd: The Demon Barber of Fleet Street from June 13 to July 1, 2012.

Roscioli participated in the workshop of the indie rock musical, Murder Ballad, presented by Vassar & New York Stage and Film's Powerhouse Theater. It was performed from July 27 through July 29, 2012.

From September 9 through October 11, 2015, Roscioli starred as the Lady of the Lake in the Orlando Shakespeare Theater production of Spamalot.

On August 11, 2016, Roscioli assumed the role of Fruma-Sarah in the 2015 Broadway revival of Fiddler on the Roof. She also understudied Jessica Hecht as Golde and Alix Korey as Yente. She performed through the show's closing on December 31, 2016.

In 2017, Dee joined Paulo Szot at the Pennsylvania Shakespeare Festival's highly anticipated production of Evita which opened with record-breaking sales at the Labuda Center for the Performing Arts at DeSales University in Center Valley, PA. All 22 performances, from the previews June 14 &15, opening night June 16, thru July 2, were sold out. Dee played Eva Perón alongside Paulo Szot (who played her husband, Argentinian military leader Colonel Juan Domingo Perón), and Dan Domenech who played Che, who narrates the story with an obvious disdain for Eva. The principal actors were supported by an ensemble of 35 with Dennis Razze directing.

Dee was the standby for Star and Lady in the Broadway and Chicago productions of The Cher Show.

In 2021, Dee was a Semi Finalist in the virtual American Traditions Vocal Competition in Savannah, Georgia.

In April 2024, Dee took over the role of Celine Dion in the Off-Broadway production of Titanique the Musical.

Roscioli is currently the standby for the roles of Madeline Ashton and Helen Sharp in Death Becomes Her.

=== Wicked ===
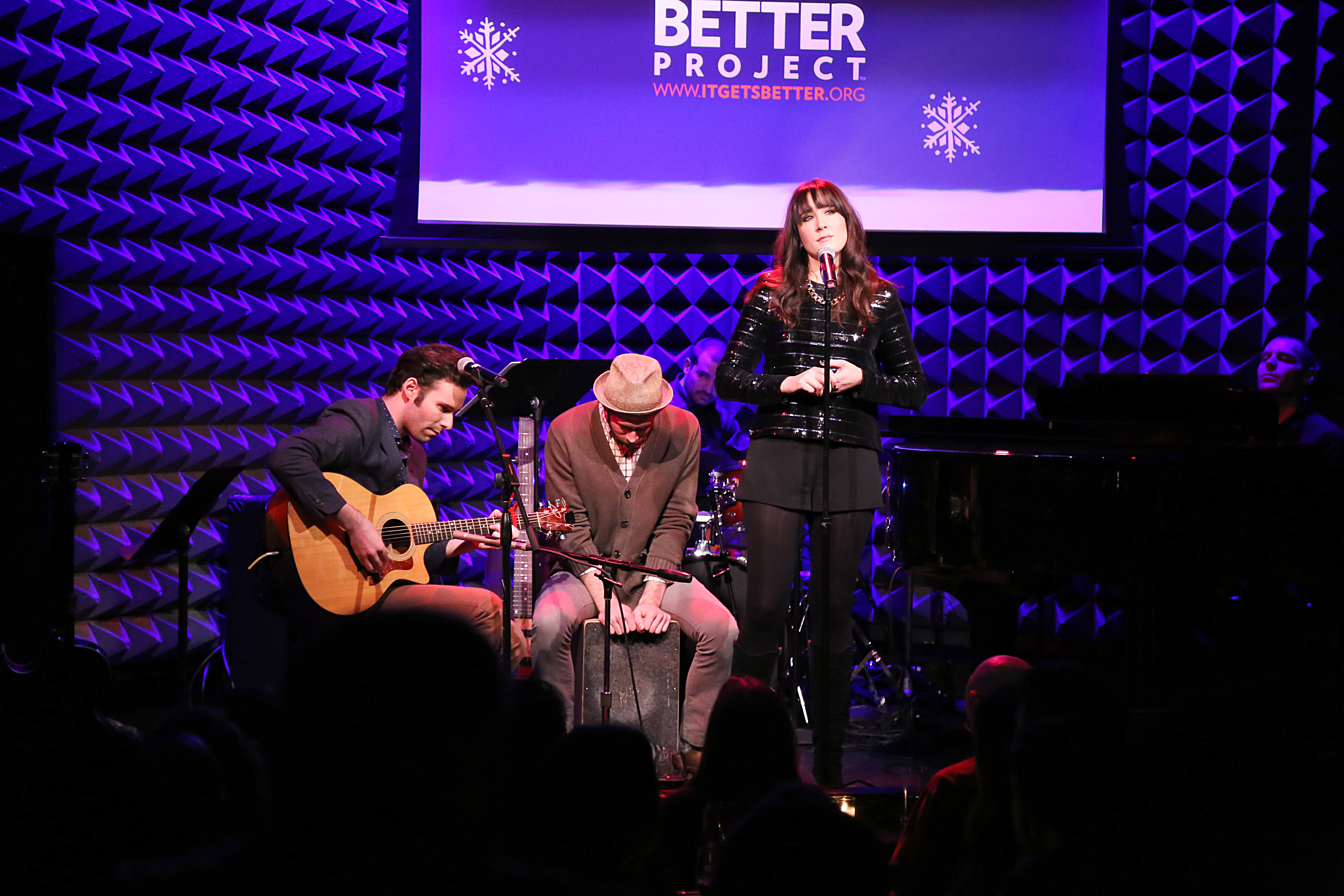
Roscioli on the It Gets Better Project Holiday Show 2014.

Roscioli made her debut in the musical Wicked in the Chicago sit-down production on January 24, 2006, in which she was the standby for the lead role of Elphaba, replacing Kristy Cates, who had assumed the role full-time. Roscioli replaced Cates on December 12, 2006. Roscioli took a 12-week summer break from June 3, 2008, to August 24, 2008, in which time Elphaba was played by Lisa Brescia. The production closed on January 25, 2009.

Roscioli next played the role in the San Francisco production from April 7–19, 2009, covering as the standby for Elphaba, in place of Vicki Noon who was performing the full-time role for a short period.

Roscioli made her Broadway debut on July 21, 2009, reprising the role of Elphaba in the New York company of the musical. She starred opposite Alli Mauzey, Erin Mackey and Katie Rose Clarke as Glinda. She played her final performance March 21, 2010 and was succeeded by Mandy Gonzalez.

Roscioli reprised the role on the show's First National U.S. Tour, with performances from June 7, 2011, to October 2, 2011, replacing Jackie Burns. She holds the distinction of having played Elphaba in more performances in various North American productions than any other actress. She returned to the First National Tour on September 25, 2012, replacing Nicole Parker, whom she also succeeded in the Broadway company. Roscioli left the tour on April 28, 2013, and was replaced by Alison Luff.
