= The Bardy Bunch =

Musical parody show

The Bardy Bunch: The War of the Families Partridge and Brady
- Music: Stephen Garvey
- Lyrics: Logan Medland
- Premiere: 2011: FringeNYC
- Productions: 2014 Off Broadway; 2016 Chicago
- Awards: Overall Excellence Award for Outstanding Ensemble

The Bardy Bunch: The War of the Families Partridge and Brady is a musical parody written by Stephen Garvey. The show is a mash-up of a dozen Shakespeare plays and set in the 1970s amid a war between the popular sitcom families Partridge and Brady. The musical features 15 songs made famous on The Partridge Family and The Brady Bunch including "I Think I Love You," "It's a Sunshine Day," and "I Woke Up In Love This Morning."

== Productions ==
The Bardy Bunch premiered in 2011 at the New York International Fringe Festival, where it won an Overall Excellence Award for Outstanding Ensemble. It went on to play a sold-out Off-Broadway run at the Theatre at St. Clement's in spring 2014.

Both productions included the creative team of director Jay Stern, choreographer Lorna Ventura, music director Logan Medland, scenic designer Craig Napoliello and technical director Matt Schiffman. Tony Award-winning lighting designer Howell Binkley joined the Off Broadway production.

In September 2016, the show opened at the Mercury Theatre in Chicago, again directed by Jay Stern, and featuring the creative team of Lorna Ventura and Logan Medland. Mike Timoney and Disappearing Dog, LLC produced.

In March 2026, the show opened at 3Below Theaters in San Jose, California, for the show's professional west coast premiere. Thos production is a condensed version with characters doubled to trim the cast from eighteen to fifteen people.

== Plot ==
In 1974, the Brady and Partridge families meet when they are booked for the same event. A conflict begins between the two families. Keith Partridge and Marcia Brady develop a relationship.

That night, Keith woos Marcia outside her window and together they hatch a plan to bring peace to the warring families, by convincing Greg Brady and Laurie Partridge that they are secretly in love with each other. Laurie disguises herself as a man to befriend Greg and test his loyalty.

Other, more nefarious, plots abound: Carol Brady, a la Lady Macbeth, convinces Mike to murder his boss, Mr. Phillips, and take his job. Meanwhile, a conniving Chris Partridge schemes to take over as bassist in the family band by driving his brother Danny to madness and persuading him to believe that their manager, Reuben Kincaid, killed their father to win the hand of their mother, Shirley. Confusing? Perhaps. But this is how Shakespeare rolled.

The plot includes various deaths and the presence of ghosts. The production features jokes and songs. By the final act, most characters have been removed from the narrative, coinciding with the cancellation of their respective shows in the summer of 1974. "The Brady Bunch" and "The Partridge Family" continue to be broadcast in syndication.

== Musical numbers ==
- “Keep On” - The Brady Kids
- “Looking For A Good Time” - The Partridge Family
- “Together We’re Better” - Carol Brady, Mike Brady
- “I Woke Up In Love This Morning” - Keith Partridge, Marcia Brady, Mike Brady, Carol Brady, Shirley Partridge, Reuben Kincaid
- “It’s a Sunshine Day/Sunshine” - The Company
- “I Can Feel Your Heartbeat” - The Company
- “Time To Change” - Peter Brady, Cindy Brady
- “I’ll Meet You Halfway” - Shirley Partridge, Danny Partridge
- “Roller Coaster” - The Company
- “Doesn’t Somebody Want To Be Wanted” - Jan Brady
- “I’m On My Way Back Home” - Mike Brady, Carol Brady, Danny Partridge, Shirley Partridge, Reuben Kincaid, Greg Brady
- “It’s One Of Those Nights (Yes, Love)” - Keith Partridge
- “I Think I Love You” - Keith Partridge, Marcia Brady, Greg Brady, Laurie Partridge
- “Together We’re Better/Finale" - The Company

== Cast ==
Character	FringeNYC (2011)	Off Broadway (2014)	Chicago (2016)	3Below Theaters (2026)
Mike Brady	Nick Ruggeri	Sean McDermott	Stef Tovar	Stephen Guggenheim
Carol Brady	Susan J. Jacks	Lori Hammel	Cory Goodrich	Susan Gundunas
Greg Brady	A.J. Shively	Zach Trimmer	Sawyer Smith	David Salper
Marcia Brady	Cali Elizabeth Moore	Cali Elizabeth Moore	Olivia Renteria	Sophie Schulman
Peter Brady	Jonathan Grunert	Matthew Dorsey Moore	Dan Gold	Noah Lerner
Jan Brady	Annie Watkins	Annie Watkins	Annie Watkins	Rheagan Rizio
Bobby Brady	Steven Singer	Chaz Jackson	Jake Nicholson	Brian Conway
Cindy Brady	Talisa Friedman	Talisa Friedman	Callie Johnson	Heather Mae Steffen
Alice Nelson	Joan Lunoe	Joan Lunoe	Tina Gluschenko	Sheila Savage
Sam the Butcher/Mr. Phillips	Mike Timoney	Mike Timoney	Bret Tuomi	Eric Stephenson
Shirley Partridge	Michelle Mazza	Kristy Cates	Brianna Borger	Tanika Baptiste
Reuben Kincaid	Craig Wichman	Thomas Poarch	Jeff Max	Brian Herndon
Keith Partridge	Erik Keiser	Erik Keiser	Skyler Adams	Dave Abrams
Laurie Partridge	Carina Zabrodsky	Christiana Cole	Erin McGrath	Madelynn Crimi
Danny Partridge	Adam Wald	Chuck Bradley	Jared Rein	Kyle Caldwell
Chris Partridge	Olli Haaskivi	Alex Goley	Timothy Eidman	Eric Stephenson
Chris Partridge	Aaron Phillips	Mitch McCarrell	Jake Stempel	Brian Herndon
Tracy Partidge	Elizabeth Wharton	Danielle Sacks	Mary-Margaret Roberts	Sheila Savage
