= Zina Goldrich =

American composer (born 1964)

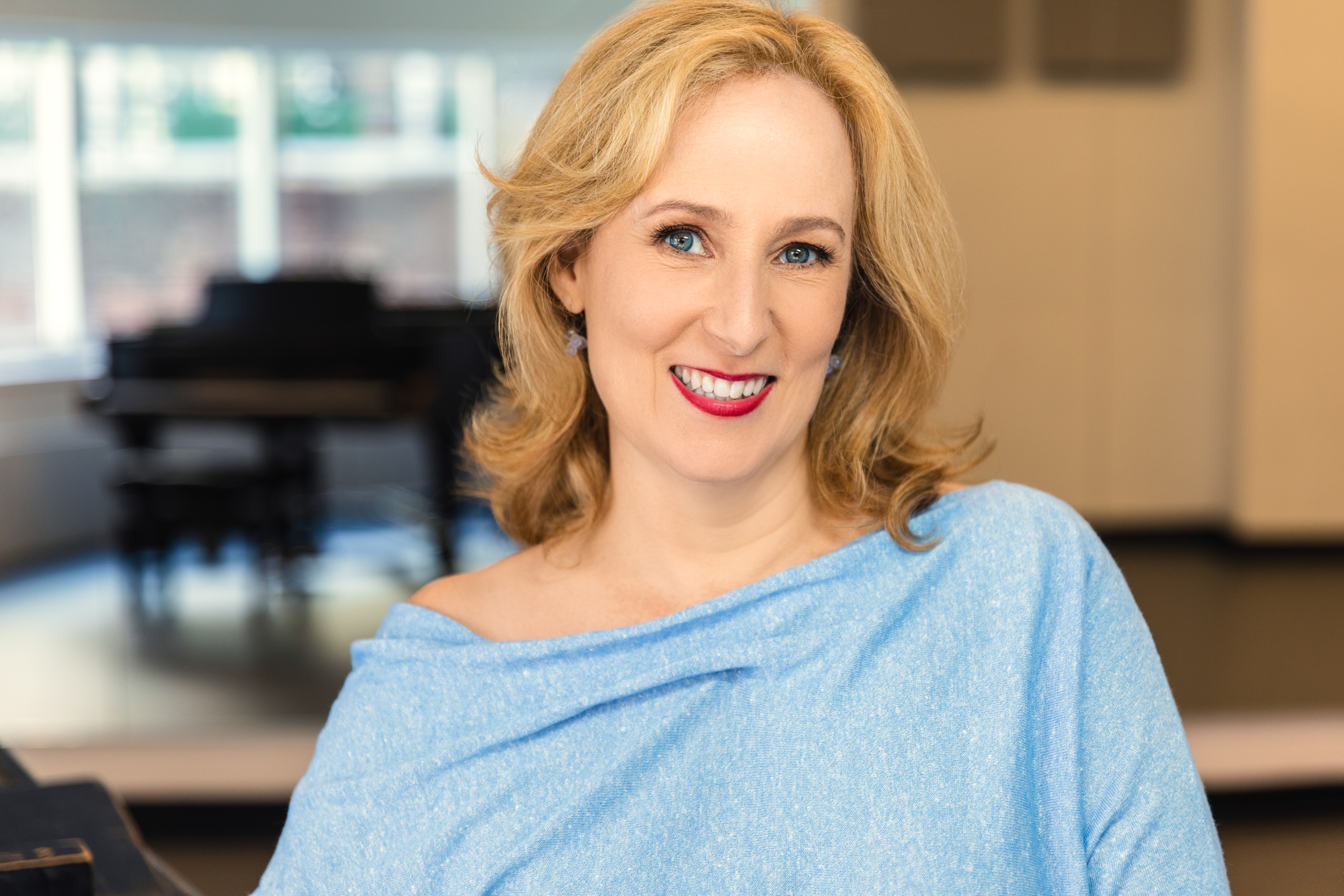

Background information
- Genres: Musical theatre
- Occupations: Composer; Musician
- Born: New York City, U.S.
- Education: UCLA BMI Lehman Engel Musical Theatre Workshop University of Southern California

Zina Goldrich (born 1964) is an American composer known for her work in musical theatre in collaboration with the lyricist Marcy Heisler. Her best-known works as composer include "Ever After The Musical", "Taylor The Latte Boy" and "Alto's Lament".

== Background ==
Zina Goldrich was born in New York in 1964, at the age of 13 she moved to Los Angeles with her family. Her father was a trumpet player and he used to play with The Mel Lewis/Thad Jones Jazz Orchestra, one of the most important jazz Big Bands in New York and probably in the world, in the Seventies.

== Education ==
Zina Goldrich studied privately for most of her life. She started studying music at the age of three and piano at five. In fifth grade (age 10 to 11) she started writing songs for her school band. She studied at the Beverly Hills High School, which had a very good Drama department. After high school, she studied at the University of California, Los Angeles (UCLA). She then studied musical theatre in New York at the "BMI Lehman Engel Musical Theatre Workshop" taught by composers like Maury Yeston. Later on, she attended the "Scoring for Motion, Picture and Television" program at the University of Southern California.

== Career ==
=== Early career ===
When she moved to New York, she got her first job in the orchestra of the world tour of "A Chorus Line". She played keyboards on Broadway for "Avenue Q", "Bombay Dreams" and "Oklahoma!". She assisted Maury Yeston in "In The Beginning", "Grand Hotel" and "Titanic".

=== Goldrich and Heisler ===
Zina Goldrich has been collaborating with the lyricist Marcy Heisler since 1992. The duo is working on "Ever After The Musical", which is an adaptation of Ever After, the Drew Barrymore 1998 Cinderella movie produced by 20th Century Fox. The musical had its world premiere at the Paper Mill Playhouse on May 21, 2015, (in previews) for a limited run to June 21, 2015. Directed by Kathleen Marshall, the cast featured Christine Ebersole, Tony Sheldon, Charles Shaughnessy, James Snyder and Margo Seibert.

Goldrich and Heisler wrote the Off-Broadway show "Junie B. Jones the Musical", a musical version of the popular character created by author Barbara Park, produced by Theatreworks USA, which received a 2005 Lucille Lortel Award nomination for Outstanding Musical. An expanded version of the musical was staged in late 2005 at the Lucille Lortel theater; both the original and expanded productions received reviews in The New York Times. They also wrote "Dear Edwina" (Drama Desk Nomination-Best Music) as well as "Goodspeed's The Great American Mousical", directed by Julie Andrews.

Zina Goldrich and Marcy Heisler collaborated with some of the biggest stars of Broadway, such as Kristin Chenoweth, who sang "Taylor The Latte Boy" on The Rosie O'Donnell Show and The Late Late Show as well as at the Metropolitan Opera House. The song has been performed by other singers including Susan Egan and John Tartaglia. "Alto's Lament", the Goldrich and Heisler song associated with Emily Skinner is about an alto who longs to sing melody for a change from harmony. They also wrote "Baltimore" for Audra McDonald and "Gone" for Taylor Louderman.

The duo has performed at Carnegie Hall, Birdland, and other venues including the Kennedy Center in Washington D.C., with The Marcy and Zina Show.

=== Other collaborations ===
Zina Goldrich was a staff songwriter for Walt Disney Feature Animation and on television, she composed for ABC's "The Middle", "Wonderpets", "Johnny and the Sprites", "Pooh's Learning Adventures" and "Peg + Cat", on PBS.

Zina is currently working on new shows: "Yay, People Yay!" with multi-Emmy Award winning writer, David Javerbaum and "Hollywood Romance" with Emmy Award-winning bookwriters Gabrielle Allan and Jen Crittenden.

== Awards ==
Marcy and Zina have been the recipients of the Fred Ebb Award, the ASCAP Richard Rodgers New Horizons Award, Jamie De Roy and Friends Award, a Jonathan Larson Award, and the Kanin/Seldes Award - Marcy Heisler won the Kleban Award.

== Musical style ==
When it comes to composing a new song, she prefers having the lyrics first in order to follow or go against the meaning of what the character is saying. Zina describes her style as "Melodic, chromatic, jazzy, warm and surprising". She wants to satisfy the audience in an unexpected and unpredictable way.

== Influences ==
Zina Goldrich's music is influenced by Frank Loesser, Richard Rodgers, George Gershwin, Stephen Sondheim and Leonard Bernstein. Outside musical theatre, Ms. Goldrich was influenced by Billy Joel, Stevie Wonder as well as jazz music in general, because of the environment she grew up in.

== Sources ==
- Foy, Ryan (2015-03-19). "About Zina Goldrich - Goldrich & Heisler".
- "Zina Goldrich (Actor, Composer, ): Credits, Bio, News & More". Broadway World.
