= Marcy Heisler =

American musician (born 1967)

Marcy Heisler (born 1967) is a musical theater lyricist and performer. As a performer, she has performed at Carnegie Hall, Birdland, and numerous other venues throughout the United States and Canada. Heisler was nominated for the 2009 Drama Desk Award for Outstanding Lyrics for Dear Edwina.

== Biography ==
Heisler was born in Deerfield, Illinois. She attended Northwestern University and graduated from NYU's Tisch School of the Arts Dramatic Writing Program.

=== Career ===
Heisler met composer Zina Goldrich at a musical theater workshop in 1992, and they have been working together since 1993.

Working with composer Goldrich, Heisler created the musical Adventures in Love — book by Shari Simpson and Charlie Shanian — which premiered in St. Paul, Minnesota, in 2000. Later that year, the two women were chosen to be among the first 12 participants in a program from Musical Theater Works designed to support new musical theater talent while they developed new works for the organization to produce, with participants receiving $20,000 and medical insurance for up to three years during the development process.

Heisler wrote the book and lyrics, with Goldrich composing, for a musical adaptation of Junie B. Jones, the popular character created by author Barbara Park, produced by TheatreWorks USA, which premiered Off-Broadway at the Lucille Lortel Theatre in July 2004. It received a 2005 Lucille Lortel Award nomination for Outstanding Musical. An expanded version of the musical was staged in November 2005 at the Lucille Lortel Theatre; both the original and expanded productions received favorable reviews in The New York Times. It was revived from March 2008 to May 2008 at the Lortel Theatre.

The musical Dear Edwina, with book and lyrics by Heisler and music by Goldrich, was produced Off-Broadway at the Daryl Roth Theatre in November 2008 and returned for a limited engagement on December 11, 2009.

Heisler also works with Disney Theatricals and wrote new versions of 101 Dalmatians, Cinderella, Sleeping Beauty, and The Jungle Book. She has written material for such Disney projects as Johnny and the Sprites (Disney Television), Pooh’s Learning Adventures (Disney Toon Studios), and The D Show (Disney Interactive).

Goldrich wrote the music and Heisler wrote the lyrics for the new musical The Great American Mousical, which was directed by Julie Andrews based on her and her daughter's book. The musical was produced at Goodspeed Musicals in Chester, Connecticut in November - December 2012.

Heisler (Book and lyrics) and Goldrich (music), have written Ever After The Musical, a stage musical adaptation of the film Ever After, the 1998 Cinderella inspired film starring Drew Barrymore. It "sets the record straight on the fable of Cinderella, showing how a strong-willed, independent girl can make her dreams come true without the help of fairy godmothers, talking mice, or magic pumpkins." The musical had its world premiere at the Paper Mill Playhouse on May 21, 2015 (in previews) for a limited run to June 21, 2015. Directed by Kathleen Marshall, the cast featured Christine Ebersole, Tony Sheldon, Charles Shaughnessy, James Snyder and Margo Seibert. The musical was produced in January and February 2019 on the Coca-Cola Stage at the Alliance Theatre in Atlanta starring Sierra Boggess, Rachel York and David Garrison.

Songs and recordings

Among the many contemporary standards by Goldrich and Heisler is "Taylor the Latte Boy", which became a song associated with Kristin Chenoweth — who sang "Taylor the Latte Boy" on The Rosie O'Donnell Show and The Late Late Show as well as the radio program A Prairie Home Companion — but which has been performed by many other singers including Susan Egan, Maggie Francisco, Linda Foster, Marty Thomas, John Tartaglia, and Alan Cumming. The comedy song tells the story of the singer's flirtation with a barista at Starbucks and was inspired by Heisler's and Goldrich's meeting a barista named Taylor in real life while mildly intoxicated.

Heisler has also worked with other composers, as when she teamed with John Kavanaugh to write "Joseph's Lullaby," which was recorded by Michael Crawford in 1998 for On Eagle's Wings, his album of inspirational music.

Their recording, Marcy & Zina: The Album was released on the Yellowsound Label (YSL 566493) in December 2009.

The duo performs the "Marcy and Zina Show" in venues around the US, for example at the Kennedy Center and Baylor University in 2009. The show is a "showcase for their stage compositions".

Awards and honors

The writing partners were voted "Best Knocking on Broadway's Door Songwriting Team" in the Village Voice Best of NYC edition, won the 2000 Backstage Bistro award for "Songwriters of the Year," and were the 2002 recipients of ASCAP's Richard Rodgers New Horizons Theatre Award.

Heisler and Goldrich also have received four MAC Awards, two for Song of the Year and two for Special Material, for their works "The Alto's Lament", "Welcome The Rain," "The Music Of Your Life," and "The Morning After (Leave)." They were nominated in 1998 for their song "Out of Love." The writing team received the 2009 Fred Ebb Award.

On May 14, 2012, Heisler received the 2012 Kleban Prize for Musical Theatre.
