= Ever After The Musical =

2015 musical play

Ever After
- Music: Zina Goldrich
- Lyrics: Marcy Heisler
- Book: Marcy Heisler
- Basis: Ever After by Andy Tennant
- Premiere: May 21, 2015
- Productions: 2015 Paper Mill Playhouse; 2019 Alliance Theatre; 2026 The Phoenix Theatre Company

Ever After is a 2015 musical, with book and lyrics by Marcy Heisler and music by Zina Goldrich, based on the 1998 film of the same name written by Susannah Grant, Andy Tennant, and Rick Parks, whose source material is the fairy tale Cinderella. The musical premiered at the Paper Mill Playhouse in May 2015.

== Background ==
A report in 2012 indicated that a musical theatre production was in the works, with the book and lyrics by Marcy Heisler and music by Zina Goldrich. There was a reading of the musical in 2007 in New York City, starring Elena Shaddow as Danielle and Max von Essen as Prince Henry and directed by Doug Hughes. The musical's subtitle at that time was A Cinderella Story. The musical was originally scheduled for its world premiere in April 2009 at the Curran Theatre in San Francisco, but the pre-Broadway run was postponed. In May 2012, the project was back on track with Kathleen Marshall directing a Broadway run.

A workshop of the musical was held from April 25, 2013 to May 15, 2013 with Sierra Boggess as Danielle, Jeremy Jordan as Prince Henry, and Ashley Spencer as Marguerite. The musical made its world premiere at the Paper Mill Playhouse from May 21, 2015 – June 21, 2015. Christine Ebersole played the role of Baroness Rodmilla de Ghent. Alongside Ebersole, Margo Seibert starred as Danielle, James Snyder as Henry, Charles Shaughnessy as King Francis, and Tony Sheldon as Da Vinci. Another production of the musical began playing at Atlanta's Alliance Theatre beginning January 2019. In August 2025, a new workshop of the musical was held in New York with McKenzie Kurtz as Danielle, Derek Klena as Prince Henry, Lisa Howard as Rodmilla, David Garrison as Leonardo Da Vinci / Auguste, David Beach as King Francis, Ann Sanders as Queen Marie / Grande Dame, Lizzy Tucker as Marguerite, Andrea Macasaet as Jacqueline, Nathan Salstone as Gustave, and Dan Rosales as Laurent.

In May 2026, a new production premiered at The Phoenix Theatre Company. The production runs from May 6 - June 14, 2026. This fully staged production stars Bailee Endebrock as Danielle, Jason Gotay as Prince Henry, David Garrison as Leonardo DaVinci, Lisa Howard as Rodmilla de Ghent, and Andrea Mascasaet as Jacqueline.

== Productions ==
=== Paper Mill Playhouse (2015) ===
The musical premiered at the Paper Mill Playhouse on May 21, 2015, for a limited engagement until June 21, 2015. The production was directed and choreographed by Kathleen Marshall. The production's design team included scenery by Derek McLane, costumes by Jess Goldstein, lighting by Peter Kaczorowski, sound by Nevin Steinberg, and projections by Olivia Sebesky and Derek McLane. John Kenrick reviews this production: "It is a joy to report that Ever After has been deftly adapted into a musical that boasts delightful music, unusually witty lyrics, and enough human magic to make for a wonderful evening's entertainment."

=== Alliance Theatre (2019) ===
The musical premiered at the Alliance Theatre in Atlanta, Georgia, on January 15, 2019, for a limited engagement until February 17, 2019. The production was directed by Susan V. Booth and choreographed by JoAnn M. Hunter. The design team included scenery by Anna Louizos, costumes by Linda Cho, lighting by Robert Wierzel, and projections by Sven Ortel.

=== Ordway Theatre (2019) ===
The musical was expected to run at the Ordway Center for the Performing Arts in Saint Paul, Minnesota from December 3 to 29, 2019. However, following this announcement the musical was replaced on the schedule by SIX the Musical, which played at the Ordway for a limited engagement from November 29 to December 22, 2019 before its Broadway debut.

=== Ordway Concert Hall (2023) ===
The musical was performed at the Ordway Center for the Performing Arts in a concert staging starring Erika Henningsen, Heidi Blickenstaff, David Garrison and Jason Gotay. The production was directed by Marlo Hunter.

=== The Phoenix Theatre Company (2026) ===
The musical is currently performing at The Phoenix Theatre Company from May 5 - June 14, 2026. This fully staged production stars Bailee Endebrock, Jason Gotay, David Garrison, and Lisa Howard. This production is directed by Marlo Hunter.

== Characters and original cast ==
Character	Industry Reading (2007)	Industry Reading (2013)	Paper Mill Playhouse (2015)	Alliance Theatre (2019)	The Phoenix Theatre Company (2026)
Danielle de Barbarac	Elena Shaddow	Sierra Boggess	Margo Seibert	Sierra Boggess	Bailee Endebrock
Prince Henry	Max von Essen	Jeremy Jordan	James Snyder	Tim Rogan	Jason Gotay
Baroness Rodmilla de Ghent	Jan Maxwell	Jan Maxwell	Christine Ebersole	Rachel York	Lisa Howard
King Francis of France	Ron Holgate	Terrence Mann	Charles Shaughnessy	Chris Kayser	D. Scott Withers
Queen Marie of France	Mary Beth Peil	Kate Burton	Julie Halston	Terry Burrell	Kate Cook
Marguerite de Ghent	Brynn O'Malley	Ashley Spencer	Mara Davi	Jenny Ashman	Grace Rogers
Jacqueline de Ghent	Emily Walton	Gwen Hollander	Annie Funke	Rachel Flynn	Andrea Macasaet
Leonardo da Vinci	Tim Jerome	Tony Sheldon	Tony Sheldon	David Garrison	David Garrison
Auguste de Barbarac / Spanish King	-	Byron Jennings	Fred Inkley	Corey James Wright	Jesse Sharp
Captain Laurent	Jonathan Root	Jose Llana	Charl Brown	Todd Buonopane	Teddy Ladley
Pierre Malette	-		John Hillner	Jeff McCarthy	-
Gustave	Jonathan Rayson	F. Michael Haynie	Andrew Keenan-Bolger	Justin Keyes	Luke Kolbe Mannikus
Maurice	-		Nick Corley	Jimmy Kieffer	-
Louise	-		Liz McCartney	Rhyn Saver	-
Young Danielle / Little Girl	-	Sadie Sink	Isabella Burke	Bella Yantis	Parker Pitt / Audra South
Paulette / Spanish Princess	-	Jill Abramovitz	Jill Abramovitz	-	Sonia Roman
Flanek	-	Sean Martin Hingston	Sean Martin Hingston	-	
Cargo Master	-		Will Mann	-	
Marquis / Spanish Lover	-		Jonathan Shew	-	
Spanish Queen	-		Aléna Watters	-	
Sophie	-	Wendi Bergamini	-		
Le Pieu	Stephen Bogardus	-			
Grand Dame	-				Jane Bunting
Dimitri	-				Michael Kuhn
Wilhelm Grimm	-				Alexander Mendoza
Jacob Grimm	-				Alexandro Partida

== Musical numbers ==
Paper Mill Playhouse

Act 1

- "The Only Thing You Can Be Sure Of" – Leonardo da Vinci
- "Chère Danielle/Ever After" – Young Danielle, Louise, Paulette, Gustave, Maurice, Rodmilla, Auguste, Marguerite, Jacqueline, Danielle, and Servants
- "Who Needs Love?" – Danielle, Maurice, and Louise
- "The King’s Edict" – King Francis, Queen Marie, and Prince Henry
- "Cruel Morning" – Henry and Peasants
- "Help Me" – Danielle, Gustave, Leonardo, Flanek, Henry, Laurent, and Gypsies
- "Court Madrigal" – Courtiers
- "My Cousin’s Cousin" – Danielle and Henry
- "When Henry Takes a Princess" – Marguerite, Rodmilla, and Jacqueline
- "A Healthy Bit of Competition" – Marguerite, Henry, Jacqueline, Rodmilla, King Francis, Queen Marie, and Courtiers
- "After All" – Rodmilla
- "I Remember" – Danielle
- "All Hail the Gypsy Queen" – Flanek, Danielle, Henry, and Gypsies
- "Out of the Darkness" – Danielle and Henry

Act 2

- "Who Do You Think You Are?" – Henry, Rodmilla, Marguerite, Danielle, and Jacqueline
- "The Prince Has Already Chosen a Bride" – Laurent, Rodmilla, Marguerite, Jacqueline, and Courtiers
- "Right Before My Eyes" – Henry
- "My Cousin’s Cousin (Reprise)" – Marguerite, Rodmilla, Danielle, and Jacqueline
- "Help Me (Reprise)" – Maurice, Louise, and Gustave
- "Is There Anything Leonardo Can’t Do?" – Laurent and Courtiers
- "What Should I Tell Him?" – Danielle and Leonardo
- "Soft Comes My Love" – Quartet, Jacqueline, Laurent, and Courtiers
- "What Should I Tell Him? (Reprise)" – Leonardo and Henry
- "It’s Done" – Danielle and Rodmilla
- "Rodmilla’s Fate" – Laurent
- "Love Goes On" – Henry, Danielle, and Company

Alliance Theatre

Act 1

- “A Story To Be Told” - Leonardo da Vinci and Gustave
- ”A Royal Proclamation” - Prince Henry and Courtiers
- “Who Needs Love” - Danielle
- “The Treaty Is Signed” - King Francis and Henry
- ”Free Like The People” - Henry and Peasants
- “Help Me” - Danielle and Gustave
- “My Cousin’s Cousin” - Danielle and Henry
- “Hear Ye” - Laurent and Courtiers
- “When Henry Takes A Princess” - Marguerite, Rodmilla, and Jacqueline
- “Opportunity” - Pierre Malette
- “Isn’t That Funny/Your Highness, Oh That” - Marguerite, Jacqueline, Rodmilla, King Francis, Queen Marie, and Courtiers
- “I Remember” - Danielle
- “All Hail The Bohemian Queen” - Flanek, Danielle, Henry, and Bohemians

Act 2

- "Is There Anything Leonardo Can’t Do?" – Laurent and Courtiers
- “Consider Carefully” - Rodmilla
- “Love Goes On” - Auguste and Young Danielle
- “No Fairytales Allowed” - Danielle
- “Opportunity (Reprise)” - Pierre Malette
- “Right Before My Eyes” - Henry
- “My Cousin’s Cousin (Reprise)” - Marguerite, Rodmilla, and Danielle
- “What Should I Tell Him?” - Leonardo and Danielle
- “What Should I Tell You?” - Leonardo and Henry
- “A Pebble In Your Shoe” - Rodmilla
- “The Wedding” - Courtiers
- “Help Me (Reprise)” - Henry
- “It Happened So Fast” - Jacqueline, Marguerite, and Courtiers
- “Out of the Darkness” - Danielle, Henry, Leonardo, and Company

The Phoenix Theatre Company

Act 1

- "Once Upon A Time"
- "About My Day"
- "Henry's Escape"
- "Is There Anything Leonardo Can't Do?"
- "My Cousin's Cousin"
- "Experiment"
- "Laurent's Announcement"
- "The Galliard"
- "How Can We Help?"
- "Who Needs Love? / And Yet"
- "Ever After"
- "Ah! Sweet Beauty of Life"
- "Out of the Darkness"

Act 2

- "I Heard The Prince Has Already Chosen A Bride"
- "Right Before My Eyes"
- "Something"
- "What Should I Tell Him?"
- "The Ball"
- "Right Before My Eyes (Reprise)"
- "What Should I Tell Him (Reprise)"
- "Pebble In Your Shoe"
- "Tell That Girl"
- "Muchas Felicidades"
- "And Yet (Reprise)"
- "We Are The Once Upon A Time"
