= ASCAP Foundation Richard Rodgers New Horizons Award =

American music award

The ASCAP Richard Rodgers New Horizons Award is an annual award presented by the American Society of Composers, Authors and Publishers in recognition of achievement by young composers of musical theatre.

The award was established in 1996 by Mary Rodgers in honor of her late father Richard Rodgers.

== Award recipients ==
Year	Recipient
1996	James McBride
1997	Adam Guettel; Jeanine Tesori
1998	John Bucchino
1999	Andrew Lippa
2000	Glenn Slater; Stephen Weiner
2001	Laurence O'Keefe
2002	Zina Goldrich; Marcy Heisler
2003	Peter Mills
2004	Eric Whitacre
2005	no award
2006	Scott Frankel; Michael Korie
2007	Lin-Manuel Miranda
2008	no award
2009	Brendan Milburn; Valerie Vigoda
2010	Matthew Sklar; Chad Beguelin
2011	Benj Pasek; Justin Paul
2012	Michael Weiner; Alan Zachary
2013	Dave Malloy
2014	Steven Lutvak
2015	Matt Gould; Griffin Matthews
2016	no award
2017	David Hein; Irene Sankoff
2018	Joe Iconis
2019	
2020	
2021	Michael R. Jackson
2022	
2023	
2024	Shaina Taub
