= Junie B. Jones the Musical =

- Music: Zina Goldrich
- Lyrics: Marcy Heisler
- Book: Marcy Heisler
- Basis: Junie B. Jones by Barbara Park
- Premiere: July 14, 2004: Lucille Lortel Theatre, New York City.

Junie B. Jones the Musical is a children's musical theatre production based on the Junie B. Jones book series by Barbara Park. The musical was written by Marcy Heisler and Zina Goldrich, and created with the support of nonprofit TheatreWorksUSA. It premiered as a one-act show at the Lucille Lortel Theatre in 2004, with a run from July 14th to August 20th. A 2005 rewrite introduced new songs and scenes, and split the show into two acts, totalling 90 minutes. The show has also been adapted into a junior version with a shorter runtime, meant for younger performers.

== Synopsis ==
The show follows events from three books of the Junie B Jones series: Junie B., First Grader (at Last!), Junie B., Boss of Lunch, and Junie B., One-Man Band.

=== Act 1 ===
The show begins on the first day of first grade with a giddy Junie B. Jones, who introduces the audience to herself, her family, and her "top secret personal beeswax" journal ("Top Secret Personal Beeswax"). However, she quickly finds that her kindergarten best friend Lucille has ditched her for two new best friends ("Lucille, Camille, Chenille"). On the school bus, Junie B. finds that her other best friend has ditched her as well. She ends up sitting next to Herb, a new student at their school whom she befriends ("You Can Be My Friend").

When she arrives at school, Junie B. meets her classroom peers, including her friends Lennie and José, and May, whom she does not get along with. Their teacher, Mr. Scary, instructs the students to choose a word he has written on the chalkboard to draw ("Time to Make a Drawing"), but while Junie B.'s classmates get to work, she realizes she can't make out the words, and needs glasses ("You Need Glasses").

After getting a pair of glasses, Junie B. worries about the reactions of her class, but her mother reassures her, and Junie B. brings them to class for show and tell ("Show and Tell"). Her classmates find the glasses to be interesting ("Now I See").

Junie B. is gifted a lunch box by her parents ("Lunch Box"). She and her friends reminisce about their favorite lunch lady, Gladys Gutzman, who baked cookies for the children ("Gladys Gutzman"). Mrs. Gutzman allows Junie B. to help her serve the school lunch, but Junie B. finds the food gross and accidentally convinces the rest of the students of this as well. Junie B.'s classmates are annoyed at her for ruining their lunch until Mrs. Gutzman allows her to help pass out sugar cookies to her classmates ("Top Secret Personal Beeswax (Reprise)").

=== Act 2 ===
Junie B. and her classmates prepare for the school's kickball tournament ("Kickball Tournament"), but while practicing, Junie B. kicks a heavy watering can and hurts her toe, making her unable to play. Mr. Scary tries to think of another way for her to be involved, like joining Sheldon, who is performing a halftime show instead ("Sheldon Potts' Halftime Show"). Junie B. tells her parents that she is unhappy about this, and her parents encourage her to see the positive side of things ("When Life Gives You Lemons"). Her father tries to teach her how to juggle for her part in the halftime show.

A week later, on the day of the tournament, Junie B. still hasn't successfully learned to juggle. The first half of the kickball tournament goes by quickly ("Kickball Tournament (Reprise)"), but when halftime arrives, Sheldon is too nervous to perform and runs off the field. Junie B. is left alone in front of the crowd, who boo and throw biscuits at her. She takes the biscuits and starts to juggle them, to the delight of the crowd, including her parents ("When Life Gives You Lemons (Reprise)").

Junie B., having recounted all of this in her top secret personal beeswax journal, finds herself at the last page. Thinking this means the end of her adventures, she is saddened until Herb rips out some pages from his own notebook and offers them to her, so they can continue their adventures together. Junie B. recounts the lessons learned from her recent adventures ("Writing Down the Story of My Life").

== Musical numbers ==
- "Top Secret Personal Beeswax" – Junie B., company
- "Lucille, Camille, Chenille" – Lucille, Camille, Chenille, company
- "You Can Be My Friend" – Junie B., Herb
- "Time to Make a Drawing" – Junie B., Mr. Scary, company
- "You Need Glasses" – Company
- "Show and Tell" – Company
- "Now I See" – Junie B., company
- "Lunch Box" – Junie B., company
- "Gladys Gutzman" – Company
- "Top Secret Personal Beeswax (Reprise)" – Junie B.
- "Kickball Tournament" – Company
- "Sheldon Potts' Halftime Show" – Sheldon
- "When Life Gives You Lemons" – Daddy, Mother, Junie B.
- "Kickball Tournament (Reprise)" – Lucille, Camille, Chenille
- "When Life Gives You Lemons (Reprise)" – Junie B., Mother, Daddy, company
- "Writing Down the Story of My Life" – Junie B., company

== Characters and original cast ==
Character(s)	Original Off-Broadway production (2004)
Junie B. Jones	Mary Faber
Lucille/Jose/Bobbi Jean Piper	Keara Hailey
Herb/Chenille	Adam Overett
May/Mother/Grace	Jill Abramovitz
Sheldon Potts/Lennie/Camille	Darius Nichols
Mr. Scary/Daddy/Gladys Gutzman/Mr.	Michael McCoy

== Reception ==
In a review of the 2005 production from The New York Times, Lawrence Van Gelder praises "a spirited entertainment" for both kids and adults, complete with "lively dance... colorful costumes... and a clever set".
