= Junie B. Jones =

Children's book series

- Cover art of the first edition of the first book, Junie B. Jones and the Stupid Smelly Bus
- Author: Barbara Park
- Illustrator: Denise Brunkus
- Country: United States
- Language: English
- Genre: Children's literature, comedy, realistic fiction
- Publisher: Random House
- Published: 1992–2013
- No. of books: 31
- Website: juniebjones.com

Junie B. Jones is a children's book series written by Barbara Park and illustrated by Denise Brunkus. Published by Random House from 1992 to 2013, the story centers on "almost six-year-old" Junie B. Jones and her adventures in kindergarten, and later in first grade.

== Books ==
Since the original book was published by Random House in 1992, a total of 31 Junie B. Jones books have been published. 28 are stories in the Junie B. Jones series, and three are activity books entitled Junie B.'s Essential Survival Guide, Top-Secret Personal Beeswax: A Journal by Junie B. (and me!), and Junie B.'s These Puzzles Hurt My Brain! Book. Several box sets, multiple book bind-ups, and a Valentine's Day card collection have also been released. The series has been translated into several languages in international releases, including in Spanish, Italian and French.

== Reception ==
The Junie B. Jones series came in at #71 on the American Library Association's list of the Top 100 Banned or Challenged Books from 2000 to 2009. Reasons cited are "poor social values taught by the books, and Junie B. Jones not being considered a good role model due to her mouthiness, bad spelling, and grammar."

While author Barbara Park appreciated being on banned lists with writers she respected (including Maya Angelou and Toni Morrison), she stopped reading information about her books because the comments were "too hurtful". She once wrote "Some people believe that the value of a children's book can be measured only in terms of the moral lessons it tries to impose or the perfect role models it offers. Personally, I happen to think that a book is of extraordinary value if it gives the reader nothing more than a smile or two. In fact, I happen to think that's huge."

== Adaptations ==
=== Theatrical plays ===
- Junie B. Jones the Musical, theatrical adaptation by Marcy Heisler and Zina Goldrich, Theatreworks USA
- Junie B.'s Essential Survival Guide to School, theatrical adaptation by Marcy Heisler and Zina Goldrich
- Junie B. Jones the Musical JR, adaptation of Junie B. Jones the Musical intended to be performed by young actors
- Junie B. Jones and a Little Monkey Business, theatrical adaptation by Joan Cushing
- Junie B. Jones and the Stupid Smelly Bus Tour, Random House, tour by Momentum Worldwide
- 2008 Tour - Caitlin Thurnauer as Junie B. Jones, Jay Paranada as Mr. Woo; tour managed by Michael Barth
- Junie B. Jones: Jingle Bells, Batman Smells, theatrical adaptation by Allison Gregory; music composed by Rob Witmer
- Junie B. Jones: First Grader: Shipwrecked, theatrical adaptation by Allison Gregory
- Junie B. Jones and a Little Monkey Business, theatrical adaptation performed at B Street Theatre

=== Video games ===
- Junie B. Jones Top-Secret Personal Beeswax educational video game for LeapFrog's Leapster learning system

=== Film ===
When asked about the topic of a feature-length film adaptation based on the books, Barbara Park stated that "Junie B. has been pretty successful already living in the readers' imaginations, so I am happy with that."

=== Television series ===
On June 14, 2022, it was announced that Nickelodeon would be developing an adaptation of the books. As of 2026, no further developments have been announced.

=== Graphic novel series ===
On October 24, 2024, it was announced that the book series would be adapted into a graphic novel series adapted by Colleen AF Venable and illustrated by Honie Beam. The first entry, an adaptation of Junie B. Jones and the Stupid Smelly Bus, was released on April 29, 2025.
