= Sara Wordsworth =

Sara Wordsworth is a Broadway lyricist-librettist. She is a co-writer on Broadway's first a capella musical, In Transit, and a co-producer of the Broadway cast recording. Additionally, she has worked for many years as a show creator with Disney.

== Career ==
In Transit was partially inspired by Wordsworth's involvement in a semi-professional a capella group. In connection with her collaboration with Kristen Anderson-Lopez on In Transit, Wordsworth commented, "I think that our collaboration on this project is a really unique one, but it’s a very natural one. We try not to dictate the borders of our collaboration, and in a lot of ways, we function a little bit like the model of a Hollywood writer’s room and it’s like the best joke wins. I think that we have a really seamless collaboration because we respect each other’s work so much. There are no egos."

Wordsworth has worked extensively with Disney. She adapted Beauty and the Beast into a cruise show for Disney Dream. and adapted The Little Mermaid for the Disney Wish. She wrote "Frozen, A Musical Spectacular" for Walt Disney Theatre on the Disney Wonder. She has co-written two musicals for the New York City Children's Theater: Dory Fantasmagory, in 2021, and Dear Albert Einstein, in 2014.

She worked with the Alliances of Resident Theatres/New York who co-wrote mini musicals to honor the nominees at the Spring Gala in 2016.

Wordsworth was the show writer for Phish at The Garden in 2022. Of her involvement, Trey Anastasio said, "Everyday, we would think up something else we needed to include. We were blessed to be able to quickly assemble the most astounding team of NYC theater talent to bring all these wacky ideas to life." She co-wrote the "Elf on the Shelf Christmas Musical" which went on tour in 2021, after initially opening in 2019 (but stopping due to the pandemic). The show was inspired by her daughter. Wordsworth "wanted to write about a family that experienced love and loss and felt the magic of Christmas."

She has also adapted shows for children for Disney Theatrical, including Frozen Jr. She joked her then six-year-old daughter was her assistant writer.

Wordsworth has been a member of the BMI Workshop since 2008 and now sits on their Steering Committee.

== Awards ==
Year	Award	Category	Nominated work	Result
2011	Outer Critics Circle Award	Outstanding New Off-Broadway Musical	In Transit	Won
2011	Lucille Lortel Award	Outstanding Musical for In Transit	In Transit	Won
2011	Drama Desk Award	Drama Desk Award for Outstanding Musical for In Transit	In Transit	Nominated
2011	Drama League Award	Distinguished Production of a Musical Award for In Transit	In Transit	Nominated
2014	BMI Workshop	Jerry Harrington Musical Theatre Award	--	Won
2014	Off-Broadway Alliance	Best Family Musical	Dear Albert Einstein	Nominated
2024	New York City Children's Theater	Family of Artists Award	--	Won

== Personal life ==
Wordsworth is a "Jersey girl", born in Atlantic City. She is also an avid runner and has a daughter who was born in 2013. She has a degree in theatre from Fordham University and is half-Jewish (on her father’s side).
