= Toni Lamond =

Australian actress and singer (1932–2025)

Toni Lamond AM
- Born: Patricia Lamond Lawman; 29 March 1932; Sydney, Australia
- Died: 29 November 2025 (aged 93); Sydney, New South Wales, Australia
- Other name: Lolly-Legs (nickname)
- Occupations: Vaudevillian; cabaret performer; singer; actress; dancer; comedienne; media personality; presenter; writer
- Years active: 1942–2019
- Spouse: Frank Sheldon (m. 1954; died 1966)
- Family: Helen Reddy (half-sister); Tony Sheldon (son)
- Musical career
- Genres: Vaudeville; musical theatre; television; radio; cabaret
- Website: www.tonilamond.com

Patricia Lamond Lawman AM (29 March 1932 – 29 November 2025), known professionally as Toni Lamond, was an Australian vaudevillian, cabaret performer, singer, actress, dancer, comedian, writer and television and radio personality. She had a successful career spanning over eight decades, both locally and internationally, including in the United Kingdom and United States.

Lamond, who came from a family involved in the performing arts, started her career as a child actor in variety entertainment aged ten and was the first woman in the world to host a midday show; the second was her younger half-sister Helen Reddy.

Alongside her showbusiness contemporaries Jill Perryman and Nancye Hayes, Lamond was called one of the three grand dames of Australian musical theatre, and in her prime a talent that could rival Doris Day.

== Life and career ==
=== Early life ===
Lamond was born in Sydney, New South Wales, Australia, on 29 March 1932, to vaudevillian, actress and comedian Stella Lamond (1909–1973), who appeared in guesting parts in early TV shows like Homicide and Bellbird and actor father Joe Lawman. She learned to tap-dance at 8 and began her professional career aged 10 when she sang on the radio while touring with her vaudevillian parents in variety shows.

=== Theatre and variety ===
Lamond worked on the Tivoli Theatre circuit, the Brennan-Fuller Vaudeville Circuit and J. C. Williamson's and was a staple of touring mainstream theatre since 1951.

Her first stage performances were at the Tivoli Theatre in Sydney. Her first performances as a leading lady were with English comedian Tommy Trinder in The Tommy Trinder Show in 1952.

She also starred in Australian productions of Oliver!, Annie Get Your Gun, The Pajama Game, and Gypsy: A Musical Fable.

Lamond was given the nickname 'Lolly-Legs' by entertainer Noel Ferrier, who stated she had the "second best legs in the industry" when she featured on In Melbourne Tonight.

=== Television first and screen ===
Lamond was a regular in a number of 1960s and 70s television shows such as Number 96 in a controversial black mass storyline and Graham Kennedy's In Melbourne Tonight. She compèred her own IMT, becoming the first woman in the world to compère a variety television show in 1961, repeating the role the following year.

In 1986, she appeared on the US television fiction crime series Murder, She Wrote starring Angela Lansbury in the episode "Murder in the Electric Cathedral". She also appeared in films, telemovies, and features such as the 2007 mockumentary Razzle Dazzle: A Journey Into Dance.

=== International career, recordings and stage ===
Lamond travelled to the United Kingdom, where, in a similar vein to entertainer Lorrae Desmond, she appeared in the British night club and cabaret circuit and on BBC-TV, a programme called "First Night" (broadcast on the first night of the ITV franchise holder Yorkshire Television in 1968), and BBC Radio. She also recorded two singles in London for record label Philips.

In the mid-1970s, Lamond moved to Los Angeles, where she appeared in musicals and television shows. She debuted on the New York stage with a production Cabaret at the age of 67. On her return to Australia in the mid-1990s, she performed in shows including 42nd Street, The Pirates of Penzance, and My Fair Lady.

In April–May 2008, she appeared in an autobiographical one-woman show, Times of My Life (co-written with her son Tony Sheldon), at the Seymour Centre in Sydney.

=== Publications ===
Lamond wrote several autobiographical books, including First Half (1990), Along the Way (2002), and Still a Gypsy (2007). The first book went to the top of the bestseller list in eight days.

In July 2010, Lamond was a headline act in the inaugural Melbourne Cabaret Festival.

=== Notable work ===
Lamond joined the Tasmanian Symphony Orchestra with Trisha Crowe, Michael Falzon, Amanda Harrison, Lucy Maunder, Andy Conaghan, and others to record I Dreamed a Dream: The Hit Songs of Broadway for ABC Classics, released on 21 June 2013. Lamond sang "Send in the Clowns" from Stephen Sondheim's A Little Night Music.

=== Personal life and death ===
Lamond through her mother was the half-sister to the late singer Helen Reddy, whom she raised as a surrogate mother while their parents were performing.

Lamond married performer Frank Sheldon in 1954; however, in 1966, shortly after a separation, he took his own life. Her son is actor and writer Tony Sheldon.

An addiction to prescription drugs followed, and she was a patient at Chelmsford Private Hospital, where she underwent deep sleep therapy. She overcame and publicly discussed the issue in an episode of The Mike Walsh Show, becoming one of the first Australian media personalities to do so.

Lamond died on 29 November 2025 in Sydney, Australia, at the age of 93.

== Filmography ==
=== Film ===
Year	Title	Role	Type
1987	Running from the Guns	Davie's Mum	Feature film
1989	How Wonderful!	Kerry's Mum	TV movie
1991	Spotswood (aka The Efficiency Expert)	Mrs. Lorna Ball	Feature film
1994	The Pirates of Penzance	Ruth	TV movie
2007	Razzle Dazzle	Sherry Leonard	Feature film

=== Television ===
Year	Title	Role	Type
1972	Number 96	Karen Winters	TV series, 10 episodes
1973	The True Blue Show	Various characters	TV series, episode 5
1974	Division 4	Janie Gibson	TV series, 1 episode
1974	Mac and Merle		TV series
1975	The Unisexers	Mrs. Lewis	TV series (recurring role)
1977	Starsky & Hutch	Ruth Willoughby	TV series (US), 1 episode
1977	The Bob Newhart Show	Mrs. Doris Peterson	TV series (US), 1 episode
1979	Eight Is Enough	Mrs. Dreissen	TV series (US), 1 episode
1982	Three's Company	Patient	TV series (US), 1 episode
1984	Punky Brewster	Stage Manager	TV series (US), 1 episode
1985	The Love Boat	Mrs. Burton	TV series (US), 1 episode
1986	Murder, She Wrote	Ad-Lib Woman	TV series (US), 1 episode
1986	The Last Frontier	Auntie Dier	TV miniseries, 2 episodes
1987	Starman	Edna	TV series (US), 1 episode
1987	The Tortellis	Mrs Hamilton	TV series (US), 1 episode
1987	Highway to Heaven	Maggie (as Tony Lamond)	TV series (US), 1 episode
1992	Fish Police	Voice	Animated TV series (US), 1 episode
1992	Capitol Critters	Voice	Animated TV series (US), 1 episode
1997	Fallen Angels	Irene Lucas	TV series, 1 episode

=== Television (as self) ===
Year	Title	Role	Type
1967	I'm Alright Now	Herseif	TV series
1952	The Tommy Trinder Show	Guest	TV series UK, 1 episode
1958	Personal Album	Herself	TV series, 1 episode
1959–60	BP Super Show	Comedian	TV series, 3 episodes
1959–70	In Melbourne Tonight	Guest	TV series, 6 episodes
1960	Be My Guest	Guest	TV series, 1 episode
1960–65	Graham Kennedy's Channel 9 Show	Regular guest performer	TV series
1962	The 3rd Annual Logie Awards	Winner	TV special
1966	Jimmy	Guest	TV series, 3 episodes
1968	First Night	Guest performer	TV Special (UK)
1969	Bandstand	Guest performer	TV series, 1 episode
1969	Show of the North	Guest	TV series (UK), 1 episode
1969; 1975	The Don Lane Show	Guest	TV series, 2 episodes
1972	Kamahl	Guest	TV series, 1 episode
1972–75	The Graham Kennedy Show	Guest	TV series, 5 episodes
1974	The Bert Newton Show	Guest performer	TV series, 1 episode
1978; 1979	The Mike Douglas Show	Guest performer	TV series US, 2 episodes
1978	This Is Your Life	Special guest	TV series, 1 episode: "Toni Lamond"
1978	The Mike Walsh Show	Guest	TV series, 1 episode
1981	Channel Nine Celebrates: 25 Years of Television	Herself (archive clips from In Melbourne Tonight)	TV special
1982	The Mike Walsh Show	Guest (with son Tony Sheldon)	TV series, 1 episode
1982	Parkinson in Australia	Guest	TV series, 2 episodes
1983; 1984	The Mike Walsh Show	Guest	TV series, 2 episodes
1986	Star Search	Guest judge	TV series, 1 episode
1987	The Tortellis	Guest role: Mrs. Hamilton	TV series (US), 1 episode
1989	The Bert Newton Show	Guest performer	TV series, 1 episode
1989; 1990	In Melbourne Today	Guest (with Tony Sheldon)	TV series, 2 episodes
1989	Turn onto Tap	Presenter	Video
1990	Hey Hey It's Saturday	Herself	TV series, 1 episode ("Red Faces" segment)
1992	The Morning Show	Guest	TV series, 1 episode
1994	At Home	Guest	TV series, 1 episode
1996	Good Morning Australia	Guest	TV series, 1 episode
1998	Good Morning Australia	Guest (with Tony Sheldon)	TV series, 1 episode
1998	Denise	Guest (with Tony Sheldon)	TV series, 1 episode
1999;	Good Morning Australia	Guest performer (singing "Breezin' Along with the Breeze" with Helen Reddy)	TV series, 1 episode
1999	Good Morning Australia	Guest performer (singing "The Place That I'll Call Home")	TV series, 1 episode
2002	Good Morning Australia	Guest performer (singing "I'm Still Here")	TV series, 1 episode
2003	This Is Your Life: Helen Reddy	Guest performer (singing "Best Friend" with Helen Reddy)	TV series, 1 episode
2004	Good Morning Australia	Guest performer (singing "St Louis Blues" with Tony Sheldon)	TV series, 1 episode
2005	Graham Kennedy: Farewell to the King	Guest performer (singing "I Believe in You")	TV special
2005	Good Morning Australia	Guest	TV series, 1 episode
2005	Talking Heads	Guest	TV series, 1 episode
2005–2009	Spicks and Specks	Guest	TV series, 5 episodes
2005	50 Years 50 Shows	Herself	TV Special
2005	Sunday Afternoon	Herself & Stuart Wagstaff (June Bronhill Tribute)	ABC TV series, 1 episode
2007	Bert's Family Feud	Contestant (with Noeline Brown, Val Jellay & Val Lehman)	TV series, 1 episode
2009	The Real Graham Kennedy	Herself	ABC TV Special
2010	Lights! Camera! Party! Television City Celebrates	Herself	TV special
2011	Helpmann Awards	Special guest - recipient of JC Williamson Award for Lifetime Achievement (with Jill Perryman & Nancye Hayes)	TV special
2015–17	Stop Laughing...This Is Serious	Herself	TV series, 3 episodes
2018	The Recording Studio	Herself	TV series, 1 episode

== Theatre ==
Year	Title	Role	Type
1951	Gay Fiesta / Mother Goose		Theatre Royal, Adelaide
1952–53	The Tommy Trinder Show	Actor / Singer	Tivoli Theatre, Melbourne, His Majesty's Theatre, Perth, Theatre Royal, Adelaide, Tivoli Theatre, Sydney
1952	By Request	Soubrette	Tivoli Theatre, Melbourne
1952	Cinderella		Tivoli Theatre, Melbourne
1957	The Pajama Game	Babe Williams	His Majesty's Theatre, Brisbane, Her Majesty's Theatre, Melbourne, Empire Theatre, Sydney, Theatre Royal, Adelaide with J. C. Williamson's
1959	For Amusement Only	Self / Singer	Theatre Royal, Sydney with J. C. Williamson's
1963	Wildcat	Wildcat Jackson	Princess Theatre, Melbourne with Australian Elizabethan Theatre Trust
1966	Oliver!	Nancy	Her Majesty's Theatre, Melbourne, Theatre Royal, Sydney, Her Majesty's Theatre, Adelaide, His Majesty's Theatre, Perth, Canberra Theatre, Tivoli Theatre, Sydney with J. C. Williamson's
1971	Anything Goes	Reno Sweeney	Richbrooke Theatre, Sydney
1973	Expresso Bongo		SGIO Theatre, Brisbane with Queensland Theatre Company
1975	Gypsy	Mama Rose	Her Majesty's Theatre, Melbourne, Her Majesty's Theatre, Sydney with J. C. Williamson's
1977	Annie Get Your Gun	Annie Oakley	Adelaide Festival Centre
	Carry On Laughing		Bournemouth, UK
1978–82	Annie	Sophie / the Kettle / Mrs. Pugh / Perkins / Miss Hannigan (understudy]	Broadway, New York (second national tour)
	Hello, Dolly!	Dolly Gallagher Levi (understudy for Yvonne De Carlo)	Grand Dinner Theater, Anaheim
	Mame		USA
	42nd Street		USA
	Oliver!		USA
	Female Transport		USA
	An Evening with Woody Allen		USA
	Nunsense		USA
1985	Sherlock's Last Case	Mrs. Hudson	New Mayfair Theatre, Santa Monica
1985	Madonna and Child	Self / singer	Off Broadway Theatre, Sydney (with son, Tony Sheldon)
1986	The Mystery of Edwin Drood	Princess Puffer	Sacramento Music Circus, California
1989; 1992–93	42nd Street	Maggie Jones	Her Majesty's Theatre, Sydney, His Majesty's Theatre, Perth, Lyric Theatre, Brisbane, Festival Theatre, Adelaide, Her Majesty's Theatre, Melbourne
1991	Cabaret	Fraulein Schneider	Playhouse, Adelaide with STCSA
1992	Legends at the Tilbury Hotel	Singer	Tilbury Hotel, Sydney for Sydney Festival
1992	Better Known as Bee		Q Theatre, Penrith
1992	A Life in Show Business	Solo show / Self	La Boite Theatre, Brisbane
1993	Follies	Hattie	State Theatre, Melbourne
1994	Legends	Singer	Sydney Opera House
1994	The Pirates of Penzance	Ruth	Lyric Theatre, Brisbane, State Theatre, Sydney, Her Majesty's Theatre, Melbourne, Her Majesty's Theatre, Adelaide, Newcastle Civic Theatre, Canberra Theatre with Essgee Entertainment (also in 1994 TV movie version)
1995	Woman on the Move	Solo show / Singer	Glen Street Theatre, Sydney, Tilbury Hotel, Sydney
1996	My Fair Lady	Mrs Pearce	Lyric Theatre, Brisbane with Victorian State Opera
1996	Gala Re-Opening of the Regent Theatre	Artistic performer (guest)	Regent Theatre, Melbourne
1996	Beauty and the Beast	Madame de le Grande Bouche	Her Majesty's Theatre, Sydney
1998	Follies	Sally Durant Plummer	Sydney Opera House with Sydney Symphony Orchestra for Sydney Gay and Lesbian Mardi Gras
1998	Dream Kitchen	Betty / solo show	Universal Theatre, Melbourne
1998	The 4th Canberra Area Theatre Awards	Singer	Playhouse, Canberra
1999	Oh, Coward!		Marian Street Theatre, Sydney with Northside Theatre Company
1999	Careful, He Might Hear You	Lila Baines	Acton Street Theatre
2001; 2002	Toni Lamond: Full of Life	Solo show / Singer	Cafe 9, Sydney, Top of the Cross, Canberra, Woodfire Cabaret Restaurant, Sydney, Dunstan Playhouse, Adelaide with East Coast Theatre Company
2001	The 7th Annual Duesburys Canberra Area Theatre Awards		Playhouse, Canberra
2002	The 2nd Helpmann Awards 2002		The Star, Sydney
2002	Hot Spots		Banquet Room, Adelaide for Adelaide Cabaret Festival
2002	The 8th Annual Duesburys Canberra Area Theatre Awards	Patron	Playhouse, Canberra
2003	Stage Door		The Basement, Sydney
2003	Not New Years Eve	Singer	Sydney Opera House with Willoughby Symphony Choir & Australian Philharmonic Orchestra
2003	New Year's Eve & the Night Before	Singer	Melbourne Concert Hall with Australian Philharmonic Orchestra & Australian Pops Orchestra
2004	High Society	Mother Lord	State Theatre, Melbourne with Orchestra Victoria & The Production Company
2004	Morning Melodies		Brolga Theatre, Maryborough
2004	The 10th Walter Turnbull Canberra Area Theatre Awards		Canberra Theatre
2005	Shout		Her Majesty's Theatre, Adelaide
2006	Telstra Country Wide Canberra Area Theatre Awards 2005		Canberra Theatre
2006	Kookaburra Launch Concert	Singer	Lyric Theatre, Sydney
2006	The Full Monty		The Street Theatre
2006–08	Times of My Life	Solo show / Singer	Australian tour
2007	Toni Lamond – Still Full of Life	Solo show / Singer	Ford Theatre, Geelong, Frankston Arts Centre
2007; 2008	Ozmade Musicals Concert	Singer	Melbourne Athenaeum
2008	A Musical Send Off	Singer	Capitol Theatre, Sydney
2009	The Burlesque Hour - Legends!	Singer	Fortyfivedownstairs, Melbourne
2010	The Burlesque Hour: She's Back	Singer	Acton Street Theatre
2010	Love, Loss, and What I Wore	Various roles	Sydney Opera House
2019	Showqueen	Singer	Sydney Cabaret Festival

== Publications ==
Year	Title	Type
1990	First Half	Autobiography
2002	Along the Way	Autobiography
2007	Still a Gypsy	Autobiography
1976	Cooking When You're Broke	

== Awards and honours ==
Association	Award	Year	Results
Logie Awards	Most Popular Victorian Personality	1962	Won
Variety Club of Australia Award	Entertainment Award		Honoured
Mo Award	Entertainment Award		Honoured
Government honour	Key to the City of Melbourne	1993	Honoured
	List of Woman Shaping the Nation	2000	Honoured
Government of Australia	Centenary Medal for Service to the Arts Community	2001	Honoured
Victoria State Government	Victorian Honour Roll of Women	2001	Honoured
Australian Government	Order of Australia (AM) for Service to the Entertainment Industry and service to the community through fundraising, including the Guide Dog Association of NSW and Canberra	2003	Honoured
Helpmann Awards	JC Williamson Award Lifetime Achievement Award for Contribution to the Live Performance sector and Theatre	2011	Honoured
Media, Entertainment and Arts Alliance	Equity Sector Lifetime Achievement Award	2014	Honoured "

Actors Equity president Simon Burke said: "Toni is a truly legendary Australian performer whose phenomenal career has spanned vaudeville, musical theatre, television, and cabaret. She is also a wonderful human being who has given back to her community, to her colleagues, and to her industry in every way she can."
