= Taylor the Latte Boy =

2004 song by Heisler and Goldrich

"Taylor, the Latte Boy"

Song by Susan Egan

from the album Coffee House
- Released: September 7, 2004
- Genre: Easy listening
- Length: 3:50
- Label: LML Music
- Songwriters: Marcy Heisler; Zina Goldrich

"Taylor, the Latte Boy" is a contemporary song by Marcy Heisler and Zina Goldrich. It is based on their experience with a barista at Starbucks. It is best known for being performed by Kristin Chenoweth on her album As I Am but was first released by Susan Egan on her 2004 album Coffee House.

== Story ==
The song details the infatuation the narrator has for the coffee boy at Starbucks. She introduces herself and takes various actions to be signs of his affection. She even goes to the extent of saying "I love him, I love him, I love him."

Regarding the lyrics, Heisler said, "So many of the stories come from my own experience, my own life, I don't think that much about it... A singer will call and say, 'What was the motivation?' I went into a coffee shop and met a cute boy. No Brechtian overtones."
