= In Transit (musical) =

- Playbill for the Broadway production.
- Music: Kristen Anderson-Lopez; James-Allen Ford; Russ Kaplan; Sara Wordsworth
- Lyrics: Kristen Anderson-Lopez; James-Allen Ford; Russ Kaplan; Sara Wordsworth
- Book: Kristen Anderson-Lopez; James-Allen Ford; Russ Kaplan; Sara Wordsworth
- Productions: 2010 Off-Broadway; 2016 Broadway
- Awards: 2011 Drama Desk Award for Outstanding Ensemble

In Transit is a one-act musical with book, music and lyrics by Kristen Anderson-Lopez, James-Allen Ford, Russ Kaplan and Sara Wordsworth. The musical, performed entirely a cappella, ran Off-Broadway in 2010, and on Broadway in 2016.

== Overview ==
The musical relates the interrelated stories of New Yorkers who travel the city streets and subway. The characters include "an aspiring actress, a Wall Street honcho, a street performer, a cab driver..."

Kristen Anderson-Lopez said: "The show is a love letter to New York and the people who make up New York." She noted that the show has evolved — for example, the Off-Broadway version had 7 voices, and the Broadway production has 11. Sara Wordsworth said "that In Transit’s 'subway and a cappella' are more than just location and style, respectively; they work as metaphors for life’s painful odysseys and the often unrecognized figures who support us along the way."

== Synopsis ==
Boxman begins the show by pointing out the amount of time spent in transit by New Yorkers ("A Math Question") and the cast laments how the MTA gets in their way of getting places ("Deep Beneath the City/Not There Yet"). Jane, a struggling actress, wishes that she could be successful and stop temping to make a living which she resolves to do by getting the part she is auditioning for ("Do What I Do"). Steven and Trent go to visit Trent's mother in Texas and are deeply uncomfortable at her homophobic views ("Four Days Home"). On his way to a job interview, Nate discovers that his MetroCard is out of money and begs Althea to let him go through ("Broke"). Althea refuses, but Boxman gives him a ride. Ali attempts to contact her ex, Dave, through any means possible on a Saturday night ("Saturday Night Obsession"). Nate meets up with friends from his old job and one offers to be his wingman to help him get a date with Jane who is there with her coworkers ("Wingman"). They go to get a drink after and exchange numbers. They both reflect on the date and Jane attempts to call Nate, however, discovers that his number doesn't work ("But Ya Know"). The characters reflect on how they still have not achieved their goals ("Not There Yet Reprise"). The sounds of different workers in the city overwhelm Jane as she tries to hear a call from her agent ("Keep it Goin'"). Jane tells them all to be quiet and finds out that she has been cast in a Broadway show. Later, as Jane has just quit her temping job, she gets a call that she is no longer cast and the role has been offered to Pippa Middleton. She asks her boss if she will take her back and her boss gives Jane some much-needed advice: to give up on her dreams and get a normal job, helping that idea along by offering Jane a much better position at the office ("A Little Friendly Advice"). Trent's mom visits New York and Trent attempts to come out to her, but quickly discovers that she doesn't want to know because of her faith ("Choosing Not To Know"). After running the New York City Marathon, Ali runs into Dave and his new girlfriend Cathy on her way home. She reflects on her relationship with Dave, realizing that pining over him has left her stagnant and she needs to move on from him ("The Moving Song"). After Trent's mother leaves the city, Steven tells Trent that he loves him anyway and chooses him and they decide to get married that day, and Ali runs into her brother Nate and tells him that she will be moving home to finish her degree, however Nate convinces her to move in with him and finish her degree in New York ("We Are Home"). Jane reflects on living in the moment ("Getting There"). Ali finishes her degree, Nate and Jane are married with a baby, Steven and Trent get married and Trent's mother is in attendance, and Althea is running for mayor of New York. ("Finale")

== Production history ==
A reading of the musical was presented at Upstairs At 54 during the New York Musical Theatre Festival in 2004. The show at that time was titled Along the Way. The show was next produced at the Eugene O'Neill Theater Center in Waterford, CT then immediately going to Off-Broadway the York Theatre at the Theatre at Saint Peters August 8-10, 2008. The production was a staged concert, directed by Joe Calarco and music directed by W. Brent Sawyer. At that time it was one of two a cappella musicals in New York City.

In Transit ran Off-Broadway at 59E59 Theaters, produced by Primary Stages and directed by Joe Calarco, with musical direction by Mary-Mitchell Campbell, a cappella arrangements by James-Allen Ford and Russ Kaplan, scenic design by Anna Louizos, costume design by Jennifer Caprio, lighting design by Jeff Croiter, and sound design by Jon Weston. It opened on September 21, 2010, in previews, officially on October 5, 2010, and closed on October 30, 2010.

The musical, directed and choreographed by Kathleen Marshall, premiered on Broadway on November 10, 2016, in previews at the Circle in the Square Theatre with the official opening on December 11. This production is the first all-a cappella musical on Broadway, with musical direction by Rick Hip-Flores, a cappella arrangements by Deke Sharon, scenic design by Donyale Werle, costume design by Clint Ramos, lighting design by Donald Holder, sound design by Ken Travis, and projection design by Caite Hevner. The opening night cast featured Justin Guarini as Trent, Erin Mackey as Ali, Telly Leung as Steven, James Snyder as Nate, Margo Seibert as Jane, Moya Angela as Momma, Ms. Williams, and Althea, and Chesney Snow as Boxman (alternating with Steven "Heaven" Cantor), as well as Nicholas Ward, David Abeles, Gerianne Pérez and Mariand Torres. Standbys included Aurelia Williams, Adam Bashian, Laurel Harris and Arbender Robinson.

The production closed on April 16, 2017, after 145 performances.

=== Characters and Original Casts ===
| Character | Eugene O'Neill Theater Center (2008) | The York Theater (2008) | Off-Broadway (2010) | Broadway (2016) |
|---|---|---|---|---|
| Jane | Denise Summerford | Denise Summerford | Denise Summerford | Margo Seibert |
| Nate | Graham Stevens | Graham Stevens | Graham Stevens | James Snyder |
| Ali | Hannah Laird | Hannah Laird | Hannah Laird | Erin Mackey |
| Trent | Adam Overett | Adam Overett | Tommar Wilson | Justin Guarini |
| Chris | Ryan Thomas Dunn | Ryan Thomas Dunn | Steve French | Nicholas Ward |
| Althea/Momma/Ms. Williams | —N/a | —N/a | Celisse Henderson | Moya Angela |
| Regina | Ann Sanders | Ann Sanders | —N/a | —N/a |
| Boxman | Adam Matta | Adam Matta | Chesney Snow | Chesney Snow / Heaven Cantor |
| Steven | —N/a | —N/a | —N/a | Telly Leung |
| Dave | —N/a | —N/a | —N/a | David Abeles |
| Kathy | —N/a | —N/a | —N/a | Gerianne Pérez |
| Nina | —N/a | —N/a | —N/a | Mariand Torres |

- Jane, an actress who hasn't yet made it in New York; she temps to get by but longs to be on the stage; Mezzo
- Nate, a down on his luck Wall Street banker who was fired due to poor judgment concerning an email; Baritone
- Ali, Nate's sister, who followed her boyfriend, Dave, to New York where he was attending med school, only to be dumped two years later; Soprano
- Trent, Jane's agent who has kept his very religious mother back in Texas in the dark about his relationship and fast-approaching wedding to Steven; Tenor
- Chris, one of Nate's hedge fund buddies/former co-worker; Bass
- Althea, an MTA token booth clerk; (the same actress plays) Ms. Williams, Jane's boss at her day job, as well as, Momma, Trent's mother; Alto
- Boxman, a beatboxing street performer/poet/rapper; Vocal Percussion

Added for Broadway:

- Steven, Trent's "roommate" and fiancé; Tenor
- Dave, a physician and former Ali love interest; Baritone
- Kathy, also a physician, she is the present-day love interest and future roommate of Dave; Soprano
- Nina, one of Jane's co-workers, she knows how to let her hair down after hours; Mezzo

(all actors play multiple characters except for Boxman)

== Musical numbers ==
- "Deep Beneath the City" / "Not There Yet" – All
- "Do What I Do" – Jane
- "Four Days Home" – Trent, Steven and All
- "Broke" – Nate
- "Saturday Night Obsession" – Ali
- "Wingman" – Chris and All
- "But, Ya Know" – Nate and Jane
- "Not There Yet" (Reprise) – Ali, Trent, Jane, Nate and Althea
- "Keep It Goin'" – Althea and All
- "A Little Friendly Advice" – Ms. Williams
- "Choosing Not to Know" – Trent
- "The Moving Song" – Ali
- "We Are Home" – Steven and Trent
- "Getting There" – Jane
- Finale – All

== Awards and nominations ==
=== Original Off-Broadway production ===
| Year | Award Ceremony | Category | Recipient | Result | Ref |
|---|---|---|---|---|---|
| 2011 | Drama Desk Award | Outstanding Musical | | Nominated | |
| 2011 | Drama Desk Award | Outstanding Book of a Musical | Kristen Anderson-Lopez, James-Allen Ford, Russ Kaplan and Sara Wordsworth | Nominated | |
| 2011 | Drama Desk Award | Outstanding Director of a Musical | Joe Calarco | Nominated | |
| 2011 | Drama Desk Award | Outstanding Ensemble | | Won | |
| 2011 | Drama Desk Award | Outstanding Sound Design in a Musical | Jon Weston | Nominated | |
| 2011 | Drama League Award | Distinguished Production of a Musical | | Nominated | |
| 2011 | Lucille Lortel Awards | Outstanding Musical | | Nominated | |
| 2011 | Lucille Lortel Awards | Outstanding Scenic Design | Anna Louizos | Nominated | |
| 2011 | Lucille Lortel Awards | Outstanding Costume Design | Jennifer Caprio | Nominated | |
| 2011 | Lucille Lortel Awards | Outstanding Sound Design | Jon Weston | Nominated | |
| 2011 | Outer Critics Circle Award | Outstanding New Off-Broadway Musical | | Nominated | |
