= Dear Edwina =

- Official Logo
- Music: Zina Goldrich
- Lyrics: Marcy Heisler
- Book: Marcy Heisler
- Productions: 2008 Off-Broadway

Dear Edwina is a musical by Zina Goldrich (music) and Marcy Heisler (book and lyrics). A children's one-hour musical, it concerns a young girl who gives her neighborhood friends and family advice through singing in a musical show. It is set in the town of Paw Paw, Michigan (but also based on Deerfield, Illinois, where Marcy Heisler was born).

A 'Junior' version for younger children cuts the songs Seamus and RSVP.

== Production history ==
The musical was written in the 1990s during a BMI Workshop. With no productions, it was finally licensed in 1998 to amateur groups, and has since been performed in schools.

In July 2006, the Rattlestick Playwrights Theater, New York City, produced Dear Edwina as a special benefit for three performances, directed by Jen Bender and featuring Kate Wetherhead as Edwina.

Dear Edwina premiered Off-Broadway at the DR2 Theatre, opening November 14, 2008 through April 19, 2009. Directed by Timothy McDonald with choreography by Steven G. Kennedy, the cast featured Janice Mays (now Janice Landry) as Edwina. The production was part of the DR2 Kids series.

This production received two 2009 Drama Desk Award nominations, for Outstanding Music (Zina Goldrich) and Outstanding Lyrics (Marcy Heisler).

A return engagement ran at the DR2 Theatre from December 11, 2009 to February 15, 2010. Directed by Timothy McDonald with choreography by Steven Kennedy, the cast featured Ephie Aardema as Edwina.

The musical played a third holiday season run at the DR2 Theatre from December 17, 2010 to February 25, 2011. Again directed by Timothy McDonald and with Steven G. Kennedy's choreography, this cast featured Courtney Ann Sanderson as Edwina.

== Synopsis ==
Thirteen-year-old Edwina Spoonapple has very talented siblings. But because of this, she thinks that she isn't special or talented. Yet Edwina has many talents including leadership, singing, and advising, and she combines all of them by directing a weekly mini-musical out of her garage. The topic of these musicals is letters written to her by neighborhood kids who need advice. She gives them advice through songs and dances that she orchestrates with her friends. One of the main themes of Dear Edwina is Edwina's desire to be in the "Advice-a-palooza" festival because she feels it will prove that she is as talented as her siblings. This is all going on while Edwina's love interest, Scott, is trying to win her over. But, since Edwina is so concerned about her show, she doesn't care about Scott. Scott wins her heart by singing her a seductive love ballad as an impromptu performance on the show. The talent scout calls, and asks for Scott to perform at the festival, not Edwina. She is heartbroken when she runs into her sister, Katie, who has just run away from the Summer Math Olympics because she was getting made fun of by the other girls. Edwina tells Katie not to listen to them, and to just do what she loves to do. Katie hugs her, and Edwina realizes that love is far more important than getting a prize.

== Characters ==
Source: MTI

- Edwina Spoonapple - A 13-year-old girl who wants proof of her accomplishments, just like her siblings. She leads the "Dear Edwina Show".
- Becky Del Vechio - An enthusiastic cheerleader and best friend of Edwina's.
- Scott Kunkle - A neighbor of Edwina who is in love with her.
- Kelli Poshkonozovich - A "prima" ballerina from Miss Sandy's YMCA class and Edwina's neighbor. She is also a good friend of Edwina.
- Bobby Newsome - Edwina's friendly new next-door-neighbor.
- Lars, Billy, & Cordell - The Vanderplook triplets who live in Edwina's neighborhood.
- Annie Smith Meenahan Johnson - A Girl Scout & Edwina's friend. She is in love with Lars.
- Uncle Vladimir - The scary, Dracula-like uncle of Edwina.
- Frank - A rude & sarcastic kid.
- Lola Nonone - A shy girl from Peru visiting her cousin in Honolulu
- Harry Petitt - Lola's cousin and the reason she left Peru.
- Seamus- a Scottish boy who wants to know what this word R.S.V.P means who writes to Edwina.
- Aphrodite/Hephaestus Swenson - a young girl (or boy, depending on the production) who writes to Edwina about their very picky brother.
- Chef Ludmila - A chef who does not know how to set a table
- Katie Spoonapple - Edwina's youngest sister, a math whiz.
- Myra Spoonapple - Edwina's older sister, A piano prodigy
- Joe Spoonapple - Edwina's older brother.
- Susie and the Napkins - a singing group.
- Carrie - a valley girl who needs help setting the table and writes to Edwina
- Abigail - Letter writer who has a gross brother and needs advice.
- Ziggy- A lover of reggae music who writes to Edwina.
- Mary Sue Betty Bob - Edwina's 15th cousin twice removed, comes to explain how to save money.
- Periwinkle - A young girl whose parents have bought a ski school in Sweden and doesn't know how to speak Swedish.
- Ann Van Buren - Talent scout from the Kalamazoo Advice-a-Palooza Festival
- Farmer Jerry - A farmer from Illinois who reminds you to save money
- Fairy Forkmother- A fairy who shows Chef Ludmilla how to set a table
- William and Sonoma- Fairy Forkmother's helpers
- Johnny- A picky boy who learns to widen his food variety in Say No Thank You
- Queen of the Boola-Boola- A woman who teaches Johnny how to politely decline food in Say No Thank You

== Songs ==
- Paw Paw Michigan
- Up on the Fridge
- Dear Edwina
- Here Comes a Letter
- Aphrodite
- Say No Thank You
- Becky's Cheers
- Another Letter
- Abigail
- Frankenguest
- Carrie
- Fork, Knife, Spoon
- Time For Intermission
- Here Come More Letters
- Periwinkle
- Hola, Lola
- Becky's Second Cheers
- Seamus (Dear Edwina only)
- R.S.V.P. (Dear Edwina only)
- Ziggy Intro
- Ziggy
- Put It in the Piggy
- Thanks for Coming 1
- Edwina
- Thanks for Coming 2
- Up on the Fridge Breakdown
- Up on the Fridge/Sing Your Own Song Reprise
- Hola Lola Reprise

== Recording ==
A Dear Edwina recording, starring Kerry Butler, Andréa Burns, Terrence Mann, Rebecca Luker and many other Broadway performers was released on November 11, 2008 by PS Classics.
