= I'm Alright Now =

1967 Australian TV variety show

I'm Alright Now is a 1967 Australian TV variety show starring Reg Livermore, Sue Walker, Toni Lamond, Shirley Cameron and Ruth Cracknell.

Livermore described the show as 'a musical situation comedy, a self-contained weekly episode with a storyline frankly oedipal.' Livermore conceived of the program and wrote the pilot's script; the rest were written by British scriptwriter Maurice Wiltshire, who had been brought to Australia by the ABC for the purpose.
