= Sierra Boggess =

American theater actress and singer (born 1982)

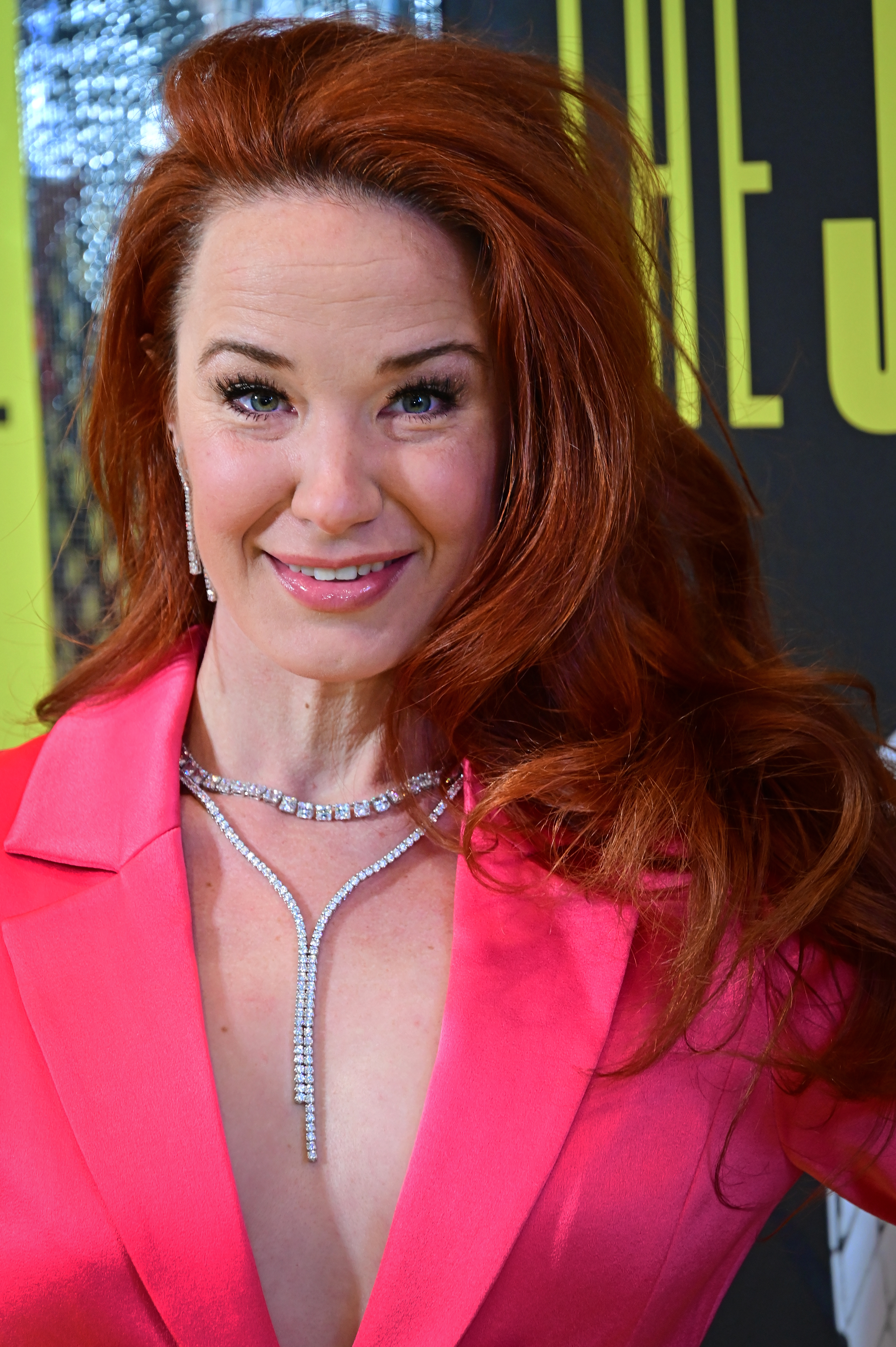
- Boggess in 2026
- Born: Sierra Marjory Boggess; May 20, 1982 (age 44); Denver, Colorado, U.S.
- Education: Millikin University (BFA)
- Occupations: Actress; singer
- Years active: 2005–present
- Known for: The Phantom of the Opera; Love Never Dies; The Little Mermaid
- Spouse: Stefano Da Frè (m. 2023)
- Website: sierraboggess.com

Sierra Marjory Boggess (/ˈbɒɡɪs/; born May 20, 1982) is an American actress and singer.

She is best known for originating the role of Ariel in The Little Mermaid on Broadway, and for her multiple appearances as Christine Daaé in The Phantom of the Opera. She first appeared in the Las Vegas production of Phantom in 2006. In 2010, she reprised the role of Christine in the original London version of Love Never Dies, which continues the story of Phantom. In 2012, she played Fantine in the London production of Les Misérables. She then played Christine in the Broadway production of The Phantom of the Opera in 2013. She also originated the role of Rosalie Mullins in School of Rock in 2016.

== Early life and education ==
Sierra Boggess was born and raised in Denver, Colorado. She grew up in a family of professional musicians. She was a member of the Colorado Children's Chorale. Sierra attended George Washington High School. In an interview with The Interval, Boggess discussed the influence of drama studies during high school on her early development. She graduated with a Bachelor of Fine Arts in 2004 from Millikin University, where she studied voice with Cynthia Douglas.

== Career ==
Boggess began her career in the ensemble and as an understudy for Cosette on the U.S. national tour of Les Misérables. She also played the roles of Binky and Ram Dass in the musical Princesses at Goodspeed Opera House and the 5th Avenue Theatre in Seattle. Her previous work includes West Side Story (Maria), The Pirates of Penzance (Mabel), The Boy Friend (Polly), and Sweet Charity (Charity).

=== 2006–2013 ===
Around the time she was performing in Les Misérables, Boggess was cast in a Las Vegas production of Andrew Lloyd Webber's The Phantom of the Opera at The Venetian Las Vegas. The production opened on June 24, 2006. Boggess played the female leading role of Christine Daaé, co-starring with Anthony Crivello and Brent Barrett alternating in the title role. She stayed with the Las Vegas production for a year.

Boggess was then cast in her Broadway debut, originating the leading role of Ariel in The Little Mermaid. She performed with the show in its pre-Broadway tryout at the Denver Center for the Performing Arts' Ellie Caulkins Opera House, which ran from July 26, 2007, through September 9, 2007. The Broadway production began previews at the Lunt-Fontanne Theatre on November 3, 2007. It was temporarily closed from November 10, 2007, until November 28, 2007, as a result of the 2007 Broadway stagehand strike. Performances resumed the next day following the strike, and the official opening night was pushed from December 6, 2007, to January 10, 2008. Boggess received positive reviews for her performance. She stayed with the show for a year and a half, before playing her final performance as Ariel on May 31, 2009. Boggess was replaced by understudy Chelsea Morgan Stock.

While she was performing in The Little Mermaid, Boggess starred opposite Kristin Chenoweth in the Encores! staged concert of Music in the Air in February 2009.

From February 2010 to March 2011, Boggess starred as Christine Daaé in the sequel to The Phantom of the Opera, Love Never Dies. She also took part in the Rodgers and Hammerstein Prom at the Royal Albert Hall on August 22, 2010, which was screened on August 28. After leaving Love Never Dies Boggess played Sharon, alongside Tyne Daly, in the Broadway revival of Master Class, beginning on June 14, 2011. The show concluded its limited engagement on September 4, 2011.

Boggess again played Christine Daaé in the 25th anniversary concert of The Phantom of the Opera at the Royal Albert Hall in London with Love Never Dies co-star Ramin Karimloo as the Phantom at the Royal Albert Hall on October 1 and 2, 2011.

Boggess starred in the Off-Broadway show Love, Loss, and What I Wore from February 29, 2012, through the show's closure on March 25, 2012.

In April 2012, Boggess announced that she dropped out of Rebecca and instead joined the cast of the upcoming musical revue Prince of Broadway which pays tribute to director Harold Prince. However, the project was postponed until 2013. On July 2, 2012, Boggess returned to Les Misérables until January 10, 2013. This time she joined the West End company at the Queen's Theatre and took over the role of Fantine.

On January 21, 2013, Boggess returned to the role of Christine in The Phantom of the Opera for the Broadway production's 25th anniversary and co-starred opposite Hugh Panaro as the Phantom. She performed the role for a limited six-week engagement through March 2, 2013.

Following The Phantom of the Opera, Boggess began teaching various musical theater master classes and began to workshop an upcoming musical adaptation of the 1998 film Ever After. However, Boggess was not part of the new musical's world premiere at Paper Mill Playhouse in 2015. She also made her cabaret debut with a solo show titled Awakening at New York's 54 Below. The 54 Below shows were recorded for a live debut solo album Awakening: Live at 54 Below, which was released on December 10, 2013, from Broadway Records.

=== 2014–present ===
In January 2014, Boggess played the role of a lesbian in the short film Russian Broadway Shut Down (protesting the Russian government's response to homosexuality in theater). Since 2014, Boggess has identified herself with the often repeated motivational moniker: "You are enough. You are so enough. It's unbelievable how enough you are."

On March 20, 2014, it was announced that Boggess would once again rejoin the Broadway company of The Phantom of the Opera as Christine and reunite with her former The Little Mermaid co-star Norm Lewis as the Phantom (who made history as the first African-American actor to play the title role in the Broadway cast). They began their runs on May 12, 2014. Boggess concluded her run as Christine on September 6, 2014.

On 3 April 2014, Boggess played Sarah Brown in Guys and Dolls at Carnegie Hall opposite Patrick Wilson as Sky Masterson, Nathan Lane as Nathan Detroit, John Treacy Egan (who played Chef Louis in The Little Mermaid on Broadway) as Nicely-Nicely Johnson, and Christopher Fitzgerald as Benny Southstreet.

After completing her role in The Phantom of the Opera with Norm Lewis, Boggess returned to her alma mater Millikin University to perform a benefit concert featuring the Class of 2015 BFA Musical Theatre majors. The concert, based on her Awakening cabaret at 54 Below, was held to raise money for the school's new Theatre & Dance building.

Boggess originated the role of Rebecca Steinberg in the 2015 Broadway production of It Shoulda Been You at the Brooks Atkinson Theatre. The musical, which also starred Boggess' former Master Class co-star Tyne Daly, was directed by David Hyde Pierce. The show began preview performances on March 17, opened on April 14, and closed on August 9, 2015.

Boggess performed the role of school principal Rosalie Mullins in the Andrew Lloyd Webber musical adaptation of School of Rock at the Winter Garden Theatre. The production began previews on November 9, 2015, and opened on December 6.

In February 2016, she starred in the Manhattan Concert Productions staging of The Secret Garden, in which she sang the role of Lily. The show would reunite her with Ramin Karimloo and also have her star opposite Cheyenne Jackson.

On August 8, 2016, Boggess ended her role as Rosalie Mullins in School Of Rock. After leaving School of Rock, she was set to portray her role as Christine Daaé in Le Fantôme de l'Opéra, the French production of The Phantom of the Opera. However, the production has been postponed until further notice due to a fire in the Théâtre Mogador, where the show was supposed to be performed. The Théâtre Mogador was only a few blocks away from the Opéra Garnier, where the plot of The Phantom of the Opera takes place.

On November 10, 2016, Boggess reunited with her Music in the Air co-star Kristin Chenoweth during her solo show My Love Letter to Broadway.

On December 5, 2016, it was announced that Boggess would embark on her first Australian concert tour in June 2017, making stops in Sydney, Melbourne, and Brisbane. She began her tour on January 28, 2017, and traveled with her cellist sister Summer Boggess.

Boggess starred in The Age of Innocence as Countess Ellen Olenska at Hartford Stage in Hartford, Connecticut. The show ran from April 5 to May 6, 2018, before the production moved to Princeton, New Jersey's McCarter Theatre for a run from September 7 to October 7, 2018. In early 2019, Boggess starred as Danielle de Barbarac in the Alliance Theatre production of Ever After The Musical. She reprised her role in Ever After for the show's third regional production at the Ordway Center for the Performing Arts in December 2019.

From July 26 to 28, 2019, Boggess reunited with her Phantom: The Las Vegas Spectacular co-star Anthony Crivello and Secret Garden co-star Cheyenne Jackson in the Hollywood Bowl's production of Stephen Sondheim's Into the Woods. Boggess starred as Cinderella alongside Sutton Foster (The Baker's Wife), Skylar Astin (The Baker), Patina Miller (The Witch), Gaten Matarazzo (Jack), Shanice Williams (Little Red Riding Hood), Cheyenne Jackson (Cinderella's Prince/The Wolf), Anthony Crivello (Mysterious Man), and Whoopi Goldberg (The Giant).

From March 13 to May 15, 2022, Boggess starred as Mary in the New York premiere of Barry Manilow and Bruce Sussman's musical Harmony at the National Yiddish Theatre Folksbiene. In summer 2023, it was announced that the production would transfer to the Ethel Barrymore Theater on Broadway with Boggess attached. Boggess was also featured on the show's original cast recording, released August 31.

Boggess was also featured in the Barrington Stage Company's production of A Little Night Music as Countess Charlotte Malcolm from August 6 to 28, 2022. From February 19 to March 26, 2023, Boggess starred as Lily Craven in the Ahmanson Theatre's production of The Secret Garden. In July of the same year, it was announced that Boggess would star as Laurey Williams on the 80th anniversary recording of Oklahoma!, singing opposite Nathaniel Hackmann and with the Sinfonia of London orchestra, which was released on September 15.

Boggess portrays Carlotta Giudicelli in the West End's production of The Phantom of the Opera at His Majesty's Theatre from August 3-November 21, 2026, as part of the show's 40th anniversary celebrations. She will part of the cast when it filmed in front of a live audience for a theatrical release. That same year, she voiced Carlotta in Erin A. Craig's audiobook Our Strange Duet (2026), a new reimagining and followup to The Phantom of the Opera.

== Video blog productions ==
Boggess has been involved in a number of extended blog series, often in association with Broadway.com. These have included a ten-part series titled Daae Days, which includes two episodes in which Boggess interviews between 15 and 20 fellow Broadway actresses who have also portrayed Christine Daaé in The Phantom of the Opera over the many years of its production. Her second vlog, Going Bridal, went behind the scenes from rehearsals to opening It Shoulda Been You as Rebecca Steinberg. Boggess has also created a video series with her voice coach Mary Setrakian titled Tea and Spinklers also released in 2014.

== Personal life ==
Boggess announced her engagement to producer and film director Stefano Da Frè on January 3, 2022. Da Frè proposed to Boggess while the couple were on holiday in Finland. The couple shared via Instagram that they were married at the Château at Coindre Hall in Huntington, New York, on April 23, 2023, with a portrait and a photo of the outdoor ceremony.

Boggess' personal website describes her as an "avid yogi, vegetarian, and animal rights activist." She has frequently participated in Broadway Barks, a cat and dog adoption event founded by Bernadette Peters.

== Theatre credits ==
List of Sierra Boggess theatre credits
Year(s)	Production	Role	Location	Category
2005–2006	Les Misérables	Ensemble u/s Cosette	-	US National Tour
2006–2007	The Phantom of the Opera	Christine Daaé	Venetian Resort and Casino	Las Vegas
2007–2009	The Little Mermaid	Princess Ariel	Denver Center for the Performing Arts	Denver
2007–2009	The Little Mermaid	Princess Ariel	Lunt-Fontanne Theatre	Broadway
2009	Music in the Air	Sieglinde Lessing	New York City Center	Encores!
2010–2011	Love Never Dies	Christine Daaé	Adelphi Theatre	West End
2011	The Phantom of the Opera	Christine Daaé	Royal Albert Hall	London; 25th Anniversary
2011	Master Class	Sharon Graham	Samuel J. Friedman Theatre	Broadway
2012–2013	Les Misérables	Fantine	Queens Theatre	West End
2012	Love, Loss and What I Wore	Various Characters	Westside Theatre	Off-Broadway
2013	The Phantom of the Opera	Christine Daaé	Majestic Theatre	Broadway
2014	Guys and Dolls	Sister Sarah Brown	Carnegie Hall	New York; Concert
2014	The Phantom of the Opera	Christine Daaé	Majestic Theatre	Broadway
2015	It Shoulda Been You	Rebecca Steinberg	Brooks Atkinson Theatre	Broadway
2015–2016	School of Rock	Principal Rosalie Mullins	Winter Garden Theatre	Broadway
2016	The Secret Garden	Lily Craven	Lincoln Center	New York; 25th Anniversary
2018	The Age of Innocence	Ellen Olenska	Hartford Stage	Connecticut
2018	The Secret Garden	Lily Craven	Unknown	Lab
2019	Ever After The Musical	Danielle de Barbarac	Alliance Theatre	Atlanta
2019	Into the Woods	Cinderella	Hollywood Bowl	Los Angeles
2022	Harmony	Mary	National Yiddish Theatre Folksbiene	Off-Broadway
2022	A Little Night Music	Charlotte Malcom	Barrington Stage Company	Massachusetts
2023	The Secret Garden	Lily Craven	Ahmanson Theatre	Los Angeles
2023	The Goodbye Girl	Paula McFadden	Theatre Row Building	Off-Broadway
2023-2024	Harmony	Mary	Ethel Barrymore Theatre	Broadway
2024	Midnight in the Garden of Good and Evil	Emma Dawes	Goodman Theatre	World Premiere
2025	Preposterous Fools	####-###	Theatre for a New Audience	Off-Broadway
2026	Monte Cristo	Mercedes	York Theatre	Off-Broadway
2026	The Phantom of the Opera	Carlotta Giudicelli	His Majesty's Theatre	West End

== Filmography ==
=== Film ===
Year	Title	Role	Notes
2011	The Phantom of the Opera at Royal Albert Hall	Christine Daaé	Filmed live performance
2018	Viper Club	Singer	

=== Television ===
Year	Title	Role	Notes
2015	What's Your Emergency	Chrissy Freese	16 episodes

== Awards and nominations ==
Year	Award	Category	Nominated Work	Result
2008	Drama Desk Award	Outstanding Actress in a Musical	The Little Mermaid	Nominated
2008	Drama League Award	Distinguished Performance	The Little Mermaid	Nominated
2008	Broadway.com Audience Award	Favorite Leading Actress in a Broadway Musical	The Little Mermaid	Nominated
2008	Broadway.com Audience Award	Favorite Female Breakthrough Performance	The Little Mermaid	Won
2010	BroadwayWorld UK Award	Best Leading Actress in a Musical	Love Never Dies	Nominated
2011	WhatsOnStage.com Theatregoers' Choice Award	Best Actress in a Musical	Love Never Dies	Nominated
2011	Laurence Olivier Award	Best Actress in a Musical	Love Never Dies	Nominated
2013	Broadway.com Audience Award	Favorite Replacement	The Phantom of the Opera	Won
2015	Broadway.com Audience Award	Favorite Featured Actress	It Shoulda Been You	Won
2016	Broadway.com Audience Award	Favorite Featured Actress	School of Rock	Nominated
2016	Broadway.com Audience Award	Favorite Onstage Pair (shared with Alex Brightman)	School of Rock	Nominated
2026	Dorian Award	Outstanding Featured Performance in an Off-Broadway Production	Preposterous Fools	Nominated

== Recordings ==
- Princess Disneymania – 2008 "Part of Your World"
- The Little Mermaid – 2008 Original Broadway Cast Recording
- New York City Christmas – A Benefit album for ASTEP – 2009 "Have yourself a merry little Christmas", "Still, Still, Still/ The first Noel" (feat. Lindsay Mendez)
- Love Never Dies – 2010 Original West End Cast Recording
- The Phantom of the Opera at the Royal Albert Hall – 2011 Live Cast Recording
- A Little Princess – 2011 Recording
- Scott Alan Live – 2012 Live Concert Recording "Always/Goodnight" (feat. Jane Monheit)
- Rodgers & Hammerstein at the Movies – 2012 Soundtrack Album
- Awakening: Live at 54 Below – 2013 Debut Album
- Love on 42nd Street – 2014 "You Caught Me Off Guard" featured on Songs of Daniel and Laura Curtis
- Where The Sky Ends – 2014 "The Devil" – The Songs of Michael Mott
- BroadwayWorld Visits Oz – 2014 "Over the Rainbow"
- It Shoulda Been You – 2015 Original Broadway Cast Recording
- School of Rock: The Musical – 2015 Original Broadway Cast Recording
- Together at a Distance (Classic & Contemporary Broadway Duets) – 2021 Album feat. Julian Ovenden
- Harmony: A New Musical – 2023 Original Broadway Cast Recording
- Oklahoma! – 80th Anniversary Recording with the Sinfonia of London
