= James Snyder (actor) =

American actor (born 1981)

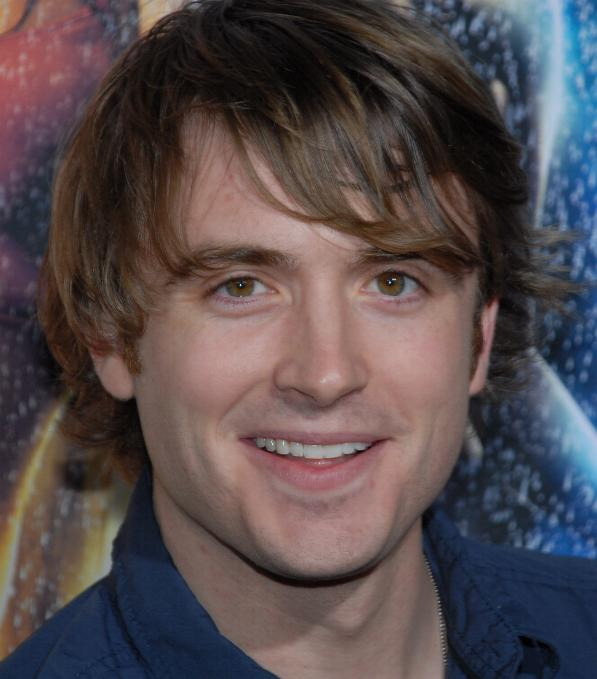
- James Snyder in 2008
- Born: February 7, 1981 (age 45); Santa Clara, California, U.S.
- Education: USC School of Dramatic Arts (BFA)
- Occupations: Actor; singer
- Years active: 2002–present
- Spouse: Jacqueline D. Snyder
- Children: 2
- Website: Official website

James Randall Snyder (born February 7, 1981) is an American actor and singer. He graduated from Christian Brothers High School in Sacramento, California and received his Bachelor of Fine Arts from the USC School of Dramatic Arts in Los Angeles, where he was a member of the SoCal VoCals, USC's premiere a cappella group.

== Professional career ==
Since 2002, Snyder has appeared on numerous television shows. His television credits include the television film Anna's Dream, and the TV series Married to the Kellys, Gilmore Girls, The Suite Life of Zack & Cody, Related, Without a Trace,Cold Case, Eli Stone, Drop Dead Diva, CSI: Crime Scene Investigation,Blue Bloods, and The Outrageously Fabulous Weekly Parody Talk Show. He can also be seen in the shorts The Baker's Dozen, A Cut Above, 5 or Die, Webloe Jobs, True Blood: The Parody Movie, Genre This, and, most recently, Adonis.

Snyder has had various movie roles and is best known for his role as Malcolm in She's the Man. His other roles include Dave in Pretty Persuasion, Jeremy in The Gingerbread Man, Seth in Shuttle, David in An American in China, and Ben Carter in Anderson's Cross. He finished filming the movie Meth Head, released in 2013.

On the stage, Snyder's credits include the Los Angeles and Vegas productions of Rock of Ages as Drew, Happy Days, The Fantasticks, Hamlet, Ray Bradbury's Let's All Kill Constance, Sneaux, Plop, and Oklahoma! He also played Luke Skywalker in The Star Wars Trilogy in Thirty Minutes.

Snyder originated the role of Wade "Cry-Baby" Walker in Cry-Baby, which had its premiere at La Jolla Playhouse in San Diego on November 18, 2007. He then transferred with the cast and made his Broadway debut the following year. Cry-Baby began previews at the Marquis Theatre on March 15, 2008, opened on April 24, 2008, and closed on June 22, 2008. In 2010, Snyder starred as Marius in the Encores! production of Fanny. In 2011, Snyder originated the role of Marco Venier in the premiere of Dangerous Beauty at the Pasadena Playhouse, which ran from February to March.

Snyder has appeared in several benefit concerts, including "Broadway Rocks Anaheim" and "Rebuild Japan", and in various cabarets in the Los Angeles area, including Upright Cabaret's "I Want To Hold Your Hand: The Music of the Beatles", and The Coterie's "Cousins: An Evening with Beck and May" and "Red Carpet Memories: A Celebration of Academy Award-Nominated Songs". From January 2012 to March 2012, Snyder starred as Christian in Show at Barre's "For The Record: Baz Luhrmann."

Snyder's voice can be heard on the studio recording of Bare: A Pop Opera, which was released on October 30, 2007. His first solo album, L.A. Curse, was released on March 20, 2008 on the Lionsgate Records label. He also released a single in 2018 called "Old River Road."

Snyder performed as Billy Bigelow in Carousel at the Goodspeed Opera House in East Haddam, Connecticut, which ran from July 13, 2012, to September 29, 2012.

On August 7, 2013, it was announced that Snyder would join the cast of If/Then, a new musical opening on Broadway in Spring 2014, with a pre-Broadway run at the National Theater in Washington, D.C. from November 5 – December 8, 2013. Snyder played the role of Josh, an army doctor who meets and falls in love with Liz (Elizabeth) (played by Idina Menzel) on her first day back in Madison Square Park in New York City. The musical opened on March 30, 2014. He was next seen as Prince Henry in the world premiere of the musical Ever After, which is based on the 1998 film of the same name. In November 2016 he originated the role of "Nate" in Broadway's first a capella musical, In Transit at the Circle in the Square Theater.

Beginning March 20, 2019, Snyder assumed the role of Harry Potter in the Broadway production of Harry Potter and the Cursed Child. He was suspended from the play in November 2021, pending an investigation, after a complaint about his conduct was filed by Diane Davis, who portrayed Ginny Potter. In January 2022, the producers stated that Snyder’s engagement with the production had ended following the investigation.

In 2023, he appeared as Dr. Miles Bauer in NCIS and played Harold Hill in the Broadway At Music Circus production of The Music Man in Sacramento.

== Credits ==
=== Theatre ===
Year	Show	Role	Notes
2002	Patrick Gorman's Star Wars in 30 Minutes	Luke Skywalker	
2003	Sneaux!	Ensemble/French Poodle	
2005	Rock of Ages	Drew	Los Angeles
2006	Rock of Ages	Drew	Los Angeles
2006	Rock of Ages	Drew	Las Vegas
2007	Cry-Baby	Wade "Cry-Baby" Walker	La Jolla Playhouse
2008	Cry-Baby	Wade "Cry-Baby" Walker	Broadway
2009	Heathers: The Musical	Jason Dean	Coast Theatre Workshop
2010	Fanny	Marius	Encores!
2010	Heathers: The Musical	Kurt Kelly	Joe's Pub Concert
2011	Dangerous Beauty	Marco Venier	Pasadena Playhouse
2012	Carousel	Billy Bigelow	Goodspeed Opera House
2013	Johnny Baseball	Johnny	Williamstown Theatre Festival
2013	If/Then	Josh	National Theatre
2014-2015	If/Then	Josh	Broadway
2015	Ever After	Prince Henry	Paper Mill Playhouse
2015-2016	If/Then	Josh	National Tour
2016	Casa Valentina	Jonathon	Pasadena Playhouse
2016	South Pacific	Lt. Cable	Benedum Center
2016-2017	In Transit	Nate	Broadway
2017	Beauty and the Beast	The Beast	Wells Fargo Pavilion
2018	Grand Hotel	Baron von Gaigern	Encores!
2018	Beauty and the Beast	The Beast	Benedum Center
2019-2021	Harry Potter and the Cursed Child	Harry Potter	Broadway
2022	Carousel	Billy Bigelow	Broadway Sacramento
2023	The Music Man	Professor Harold Hill	Broadway Sacramento

=== Film ===
Year	Title	Role	Notes
2005	Pretty Persuasion	David	
2005	The Baker's Dozen	Jeremy Leigh	Short
2005	The Gingerdead Man	Jeremy Leigh	
2006	She's the Man	Malcolm Festes	
2006	A Cut Above	Trent Desmond	Short
2008	Shuttle	Seth	
2008	An American in China	David Braddock	
2010	Anderson's Cross	Ben Carter	Short
2010	Webloe Jobs	Dick Webloe	Short
2011	True Blood: The Parody Movie	Jason Stackhouse	Short
2012	Genre This	Justin Amara	Short
2013	Adonis	Kip	Short
2013	Meth Head	Pete	

=== TV ===
- Anna's Dream, Kyle (TV movie), 2002
- Married to the Kellys, Zac (1 episode), 2004
- Gilmore Girls, Yale Guy No. 1 (1 episode), 2004
- The Suite Life of Zack & Cody, Jason Harrington (1 episode), 2005
- Related, Collin, (1 episode), 2005
- Without a Trace, Breck Mulligan (1 episode), 2006
- Cold Case, Bingo Zohar '53 (1 episode), 2007
- Eli Stone, Carter Jameson (1 episode), 2008
- 5 or Die, Freddy (short), 2008
- Drop Dead Diva, David (1 episode), 2010
- CSI: Crime Scene Investigation, Hunter Ahearn (1 episode), 2011
- Blue Bloods, Billy Coffin (1 episode), 2011
- The Outrageously Fabulous Weekly Parody Show, Ensemble (1 episode), 2012
- Internet Icon, Actor (1 episode), 2013
- Rizzoli and Isles, Brad Adams (1 episode), 2013
- Hey Kid: Backstage at If/Then with James Snyder, Self (24 episodes), 2014–15
- The Good Wife, Gil Berridge (1 episode), 2015
- Your Friends & Neighbors, Toby (3 episodes), 2025

=== Discography ===
- Bare: A Pop Opera (studio cast recording), 2007
- L.A. Curse, 2008, debut solo album
- If/Then (original Broadway cast recording), 2014, No. 19 on the Billboard 200
- Cry-Baby (studio cast recording), 2015
- HouseBroken, Bernstein / Handsome Lab / Jimmy Chonga (voice, 4 episodes), 2021–2022
- NCIS, Dr. Miles Bauer (1 episode), 2023
- FBI: International, Steve Hale (1 episode), 2025
- Your Friends & Neighbors, Toby (3 episodes), 2025

== Concerts ==
- February 28, 2011 – Show at Barre in Los Angeles (w/ Bryce Ryness)
- May 3, 2015 – Birdland (w/ Prince Charming)
- September 17, 2015 – Cry-Baby Reunion at 54 Below

== Awards and nominations ==
- 2014 Broadway.com Audience Award for Favorite Onstage Pair (w/ Idina Menzel) for If/Then (won)
- 2014 Broadway.com Audience Award for Favorite Supporting Actor in a Musical for If/Then (nominated)
