= Margo Seibert =

American actress and singer (born 1984)

- Born: July 21, 1984 (age 42)
- Occupations: Actress; singer
- Years active: 2011–present

Margo Seibert (born July 21, 1984) is an American actress and singer.

== Early life ==
Seibert is the daughter of Debbie (née Sykes) and Willis Seibert. She has one sister. She graduated from Glenelg High School in 2002 and American University in 2005 with a degree in international relations, and also was involved with theatre.

== Career ==
Seibert was nominated for a Drama Desk Award in 2014 for playing the title character of Tamar in the Off-Broadway musical Tamar of the River by Marisa Michelson and Joshua H. Cohen and produced by the Prospect Theatre Company. She made her Broadway debut originating the role of Adrian Pennino in the musical version of Rocky originally played in the films by Talia Shire. Later, she played Tock in the musical adaptation of The Phantom Tollbooth at the Kennedy Center.

She played the role of Danielle in Ever After, the musical adaptation of the 1998 Cinderella film version of the same name. The musical opened at the Paper Mill Playhouse, Millburn, New Jersey, in May 2015.

She performed the 1933 song "Deep Purple" with pianist Michael Kanan in a horror episode of the fiction podcast anthology series The Truth, titled "A Drop in the Ocean" and released on February 9, 2017.

In October 2018, Seibert released her debut album 77th Street.

She played the role of Jane in the Original Broadway cast of the a capella musical In Transit, which opened on Broadway on December 11, 2016.

Seibert played the role of Jessica in the hit Off-Broadway musical Octet in 2019. Similar to In Transit, Octet is performed entirely a capella, using a chamber choir style. The production released a live cast album on November 15, 2019.

== Filmography ==
- Boardwalk Empire (2012) (Uppity Nanny) (Blue Bell Boy)
- Elementary (2016) (Amanda Neal) (Art Imitates Art)
- Dope Crash (2017) (Maddie)
- Instinct (2018) (Gwen Anderson) (Wild Game)
- The Good Cop (2018) (Lois Ronstadt) (Who Is the Ugly German Lady?)
