= Tony Sheldon (actor) =

Australian actor/singer (born 1955)

- Born: 12 September 1955 (age 71)
- Occupations: Actor; singer; writer
- Parent: Toni Lamond (mother)
- Relatives: Helen Reddy (aunt)
- Musical career
- Origin: Brisbane, Queensland, Australia

Tony Sheldon (born 12 September 1955) is an Australian actor and singer, best known for his work in theatre, especially his role as Bernadette in the original Australian stage production of the musical Priscilla, Queen of the Desert. He is also a writer.

== Early life ==
Sheldon born in 1955, comes from one of Australia's leading theatrical families: his mother was Toni Lamond, who was born into a legendary Australian showbiz family. Her father was comedian Joe Lawman and her mother was vaudellian, actress and comedian Stella Lamond. Her mother subsequently married Maxwell Reddy with whom she had a second daughter, Helen Reddy.

His father was TV producer Frank Sheldon who died by suicide 2 days after Tony turned 11.

In 1993, Sheldon starred as the Baker in the Australian premiere of Into the Woods. One year later he starred as Mendel in Falsettos in its Australia premiere.

Sheldon won the 2005 Helpmann Award, the Sydney Critics Award, the Mo Award and a Glugs Award for his performance as Roger de Bris in The Producers in 2005. He was also nominated for a Helpmann and a Green Room Award for his work in The Witches of Eastwick in 2003. He wrote and directed The Times of My Life at the Ensemble Theatre (2006) and the Adelaide Cabaret Festival for his mother, Toni Lamond.

Sheldon played more than 1,700 performances as Bernadette in Priscilla Queen of the Desert in Sydney, Melbourne, Auckland, West End (2009) and Toronto prior to the Broadway premiere in March 2011. He won the Green Room Award, Best Male Artist in a Leading Role, and was nominated for an Olivier Award (2010, London). He was nominated for the Tony Award as Best Actor in a Musical for his performance in Priscilla on Broadway. He played Horace in Hello, Dolly! at the Goodspeed Opera House in 2013. In 2014, he portrayed Merlyn and Pellinore in a concert staging of Camelot at the Kennedy Center. As part of the tenth anniversary tour in Australia presented by Michael Cassel Group, Tony performed his 1800th performance as Bernadette in Melbourne on 7 March 2018 and hit the milestone of 1900 performances in the role on Wednesday 20 June at the Capitol Theatre in Sydney. He played Dufayel in the musical adaption of Amélie on Broadway in 2017. Starting in 2019 he played Grandpa Joe in the Australian production of Charlie and the Chocolate Factory until February 2020.

== Personal life ==
Sheldon and his long-term partner, actor and playwright Tony Taylor, had been together for 45 years in 2025.

== Awards and nominations ==
Dirty Rotten Scoundrels, 2011 Glug Awards – Colleen Clifford Memorial Award Outstanding Performance in a Musical or Special Comedy Satire, co-winner, for

Broadway, "Priscilla", 2011

- Tony Award-Leading Actor in a Musical (nomination)
- Drama League-Outstanding Performance (nomination)
- Drama Desk- Leading Actor in a Musical (nomination)
- Outer Critics Circle Award-Leading Actor in a Musical (nomination)
- Theatre World Award (winner)

West End, Priscilla, 2009

- Oliver Award – Leading Performance in a Musical (nomination)
- What's on Stage Award – Leading Performance in a Musical (nomination)

Australia, Priscilla, 2006/7

- Sydney Theatre Critics Award – Best Actor in a Musical (winner)
- Greenroom Award – Best Actor in a Musical (winner)
- Mo Award – Musical Theatre Performer of the Year (winner)
- Aussietheatre.com – Best Actor in a Musical (winner)
- Helpmann Award for Best Male Actor in a Musical (nomination)
- Australian Dance Award – (nomination)

2005, The Producers

- Helpmann Award for Best Male Actor in a Supporting Role in a Musical (winner)
- Mo Award – Best Featured Actor in a Musical (winner)
- Sydney Theatre Critics Award – Best Featured Actor in a Musical (winner)
- Glugs Award – "Most Versatile" (winner)
- Greenroom Award – Best Featured Actor in a Musical (nomination)

2003, The Witches of Eastwick

- Helpmann Award for Best Male Actor in a Supporting Role in a Musical (nomination)
- Green Room Award for Male Actor in a Leading Role (Music Theatre) (nomination)

2000, A Poor Student

- Norman Kessell Memorial Award for Outstanding Performance – Actor

1994

- Glugs Award – Best Actor in a Play, A Poor Student (winner)
- Green Room Award – Best Supporting Actor in a Musical, Falsettos

1991, Wherefore Art Thou, Cabaret?

- Mo Award – Performer of the Year (nomination)
- Mo Award – Best Actor in a Musical (nomination)

1985, Madonna and Child

- Green Room Award – Best Actor in a Musical (nomination)
- Greenroom Award – Best Director of a Musical (nomination)

1984, Torch Song Trilogy

- Greenroom Award – Best Actor in a Play (winner)
- Variety Club Heart Award – Actor of the Year (winner)
- Sidney Myer Award – Contribution to Sydney Theatre (nomination)

1977, Inner Voices

- National Theatre Award – Best Actor in a Play (winner)
- Sydney Theatre Critics Award – (winner)

== Discography ==
=== Cast albums and soundtracks ===
- The Venetian Twins - original cast (1979)
- I Love My Wife - original Australian cast (1982)
- Once In A Blue Moon - a celebration of Australian musicals (1994)
- Lift Off Live (1995)
- Songs from Fame the musical - Australian cast (1999)
- Priscilla, Queen of the Desert - original Australian cast (2007)
- Priscilla, Queen of the Desert - original Broadway cast (2011)
- Man of La Mancha - Australian cast (2015)

== Select acting credits ==
=== Film ===
- Spoiled (1974) as The Boy

=== Television ===
- Murder Call (1998, S2 E13: A Dress to Die For) as Garth Boyle

=== Theatre ===
Year	Title	Role	Notes
1993	Into the Woods	The Baker	Australia premiere
1994	Falsettos	Dr. Mendel	Australia premiere
1996	Merrily We Roll Along	Joe Josephsen	Australia premiere
2004-2005	The Producers	Roger de Bris	Australia premiere tour
2006-2008	Priscilla, Queen of the Desert	Bernadette	Australia premiere tour
2009	Priscilla, Queen of the Desert	Bernadette	Palace Theatre, London
2010-2011	Priscilla, Queen of the Desert	Bernadette	Toronto
2011-2012	Priscilla, Queen of the Desert	Bernadette	Broadway
2013	Camelot	King Pellinore	Theatre Under the Stars
2013	Hello, Dolly!	Horace Vandergelder	Goodspeed Opera House
2013	Dirty Rotten Scoundrels	Lawrence Jameson	Theatre Royal, Sydney
2014	Camelot	King Pellinore / Merlyn	Kennedy Center
2014	My Fair Lady	Colonel Hugh Pickering	Guthrie Theater
2014	The Band Wagon	Jeffrey Cordova	Encores!
2015	Man of La Mancha	Miguel Cervantes / Don Quixote	Seymour Centre
2015	Ever After The Musical	Leonardo da Vinci	Paper Mill Playhouse
2015	Amélie	Dufayel / Collignon	Berkeley Repertory Theatre
2016-2017	Amélie	Dufayel / Collignon	Ahmanson Theatre
2017	Amélie	Dufayel / Collignon	Broadway
2019-2020	Charlie and the Chocolate Factory	Grandpa Joe	Capitol Theatre & Her Majesty's Theatre
