= Christine Ebersole =

American actress and singer (born 1953)

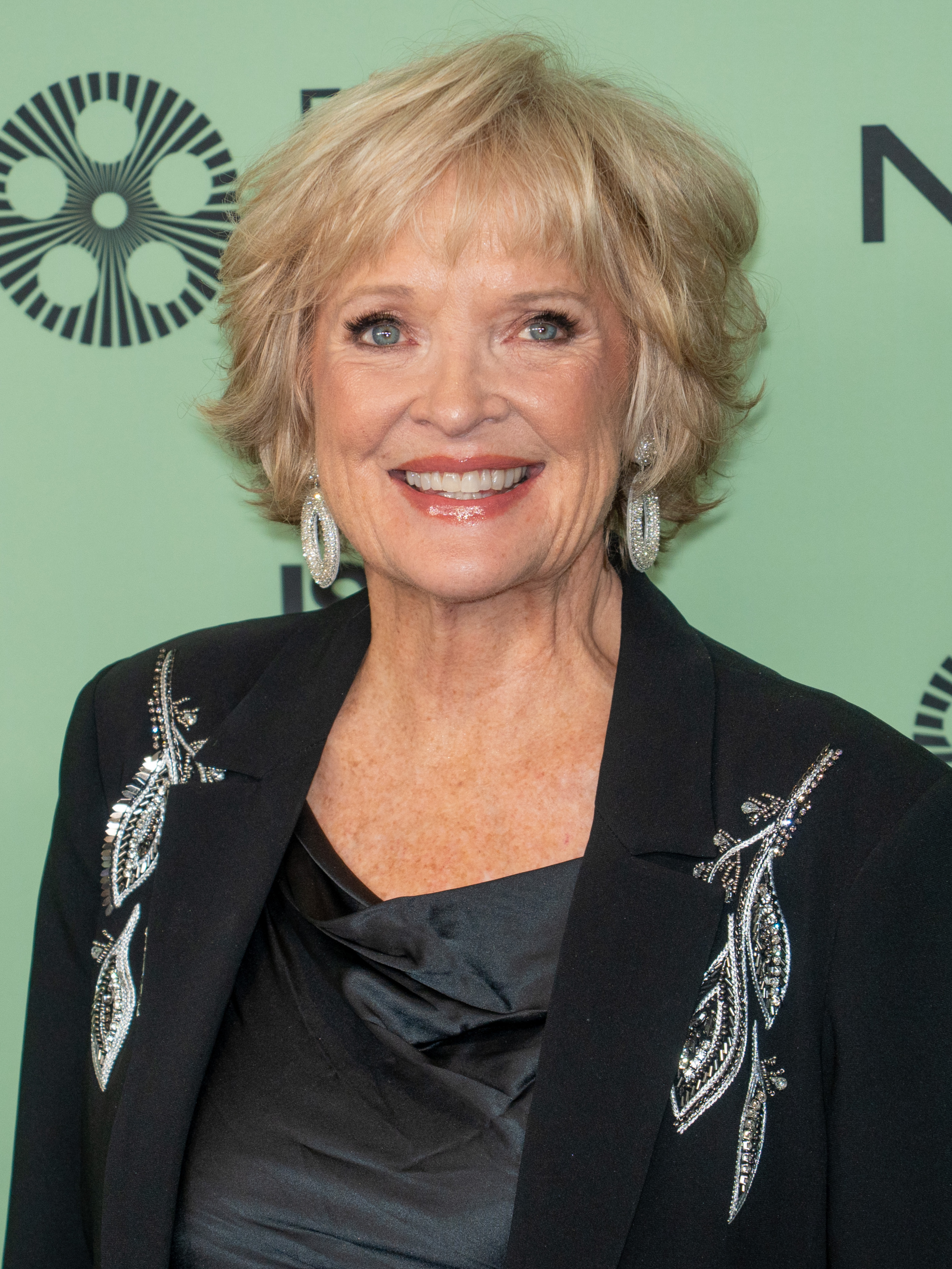
- Ebersole at the 2025 New York Film Festival
- Born: February 21, 1953 (age 73); Winnetka, Illinois, U.S.
- Education: MacMurray College
- Occupations: Actress, singer, comedian
- Years active: 1972–present
- Spouses: Peter Bergman (m. 1976; div. 1981) Bill Moloney (m. 1988)
- Children: 3

Christine Ebersole (born February 21, 1953) is an American actress, singer, and comedian. She has appeared in film, television, and on stage. She has received two Tony Awards, and a Drama Desk Award as well as a nomination for a Daytime Emmy Award.

Ebersole made her Broadway debut in the play Angel Street (1975). She won two Tony Awards for Best Actress in a Musical for playing a prima donna in the musical revival 42nd Street (2001) and for her dual roles as Edith Bouvier Beale and Edith Ewing Bouvier Beale in the original musical Grey Gardens (2006). She was Tony-nominated for playing a society matron in Dinner at Eight (2003), and Elizabeth Arden in War Paint (2017).

On film, she made her film debut with a minor role as an actress in the romantic comedy Tootsie (1982) before portraying Caterina Cavalieri in Academy Award-winning period biographical drama film Amadeus (1984). She has also acted in films such as Mac and Me (1988), Dead Again (1991), Richie Rich (1994), Black Sheep (1996), True Crime (1999), The Big Wedding (2013), The Wolf of Wall Street (2013), and Licorice Pizza (2021).

On television, she got her start on the soap opera Ryan's Hope (1977–1980) and as a cast member of Saturday Night Live (1981–1982). She earned an Emmy Award nomination for her work in One Life to Live. She has co-starred on the TBS sitcom Sullivan & Son (2012–2014), the comedy-drama Royal Pains, the animated series Steven Universe (2018–2019), and the CBS sitcom Bob Hearts Abishola (2019–2024).

== Early life and education ==
Ebersole was born outside of Chicago in Winnetka, Illinois, the daughter of Marian Esther (née Goodley) and Robert "Bob" Ebersole. Her father was the president of a steel company in Milwaukee, Wisconsin. She has Swiss-German and Irish ancestry.

Ebersole graduated from New Trier High School in 1971. She attended MacMurray College in Jacksonville, Illinois, class of 1975, and the American Academy of Dramatic Arts.

== Career ==
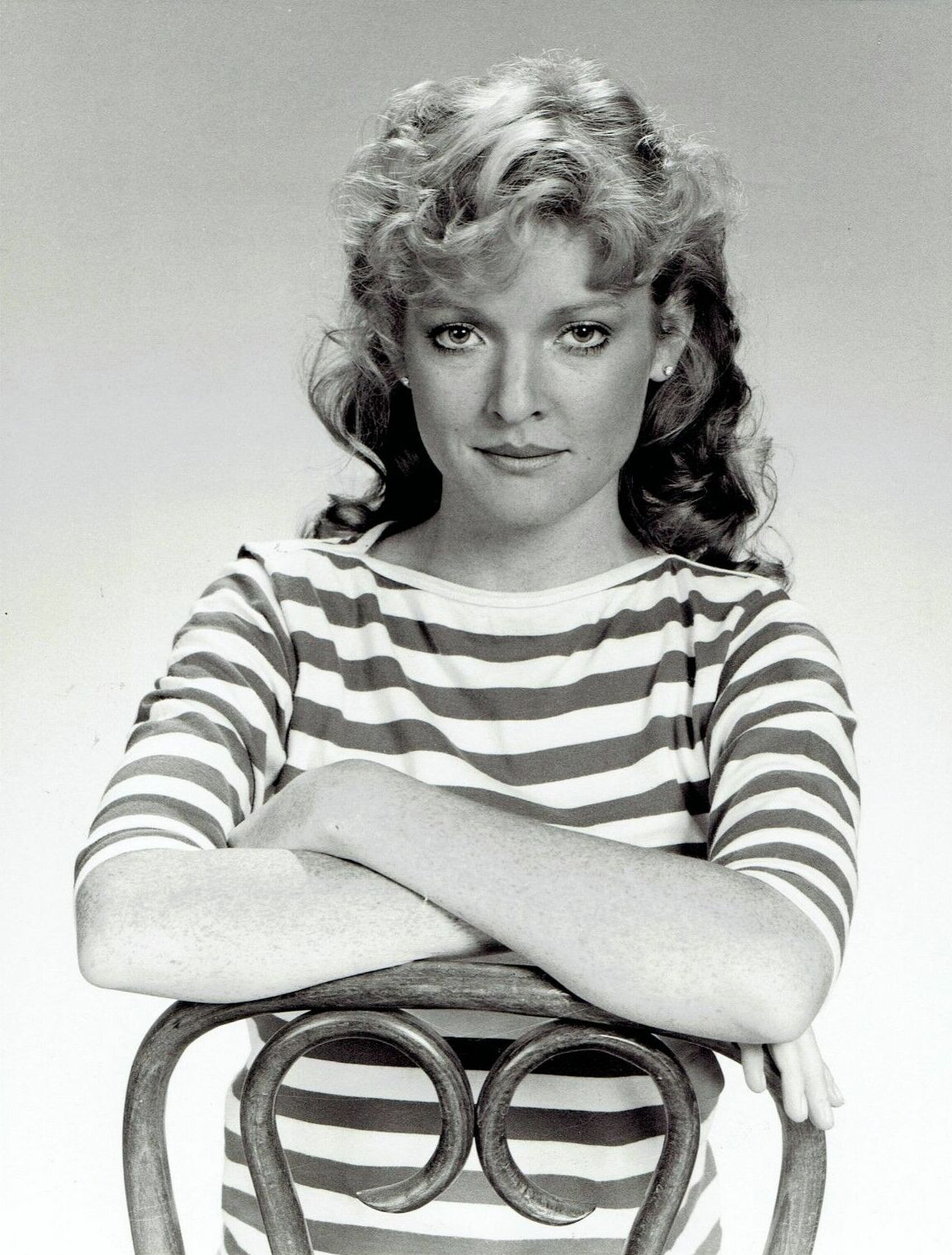
Ebersole in a Saturday Night Live promotional photo, 1981

She met Marc Shaiman when he was 19 and the musical director of her first club act. She appeared in two different parts on Ryan's Hope in 1977 (as a nurse) and 1980 (as Lily Darnell).

Ebersole was a cast member of Saturday Night Live during 1981–82, the first full season under new producer Dick Ebersol (their similar surnames being a coincidence), acting as "Weekend Update" co-anchor with Brian Doyle-Murray. Among her impersonations were Mary Travers, Cheryl Tiegs, Barbara Mandrell, Diana, Princess of Wales, and Rona Barrett.

Following SNL, she appeared in One Life to Live as daffy Maxie McDermott (receiving an Emmy nomination) and Valerie. She co-starred with Barnard Hughes on the sitcom The Cavanaughs, played the title role in the short-lived sitcom Rachel Gunn, R.N., and guest-starred on Will & Grace, Dolly!, Just Shoot Me, Murphy Brown, Ally McBeal, Samantha Who, Boston Legal, The Colbert Report, and Royal Pains. In 1991, she appeared as the titular Miss Jones in a pilot for an ABC series about a single mother, but the series was not taken up.

She appeared in the 1993 television film adaptation of Gypsy starring Bette Midler, and in the 2000 ABC-TV film Mary and Rhoda starring Mary Tyler Moore and Valerie Harper.

In 2011, she had a recurring role on the TV Land sitcom Retired at 35. In 2014, she played Carol Walsh on the TBS sitcom Sullivan & Son. She has a recurring role on the USA Network television show Royal Pains as Ms. Newberg.

Ebersole's films have included Tootsie (1982), Amadeus (1984), Mac and Me (1988), My Girl 2 (1994), Richie Rich (1994), Black Sheep (1996), and My Favorite Martian (1999).

=== Stage ===
Ebersole has found considerable success on stage. She appeared in Going Hollywood, a musical by David Zippel and Jeremy Shaeffer. She was in the chorus in 1983 with Jerry Mitchell. They were both excited about the possibility of going to Broadway but never made it. She was featured in Paper Moon by Larry Grossman and Ellen Fitzhugh and Carol Hall, which ran at the Paper Mill Playhouse (Millburn, New Jersey) in September 1993. Off-Broadway, she has appeared in Three Sisters and Talking Heads, and her Broadway credits include On the Twentieth Century, the 1979 revival of Oklahoma! (as Ado Annie), the 1980 revival of Camelot and the 2000 revival of Gore Vidal's The Best Man.

In 2001, she appeared in the Broadway revival of 42nd Street as Dorothy Brock, for which she won her first Tony Award for Best Leading Actress in a Musical, She next appeared in the 2002 Broadway revival of Dinner at Eight as Millicent Jordan for which she was nominated for the Tony Award, Featured Actress in a Play. In 2005, she played M'Lynn in the Broadway production of Steel Magnolias.

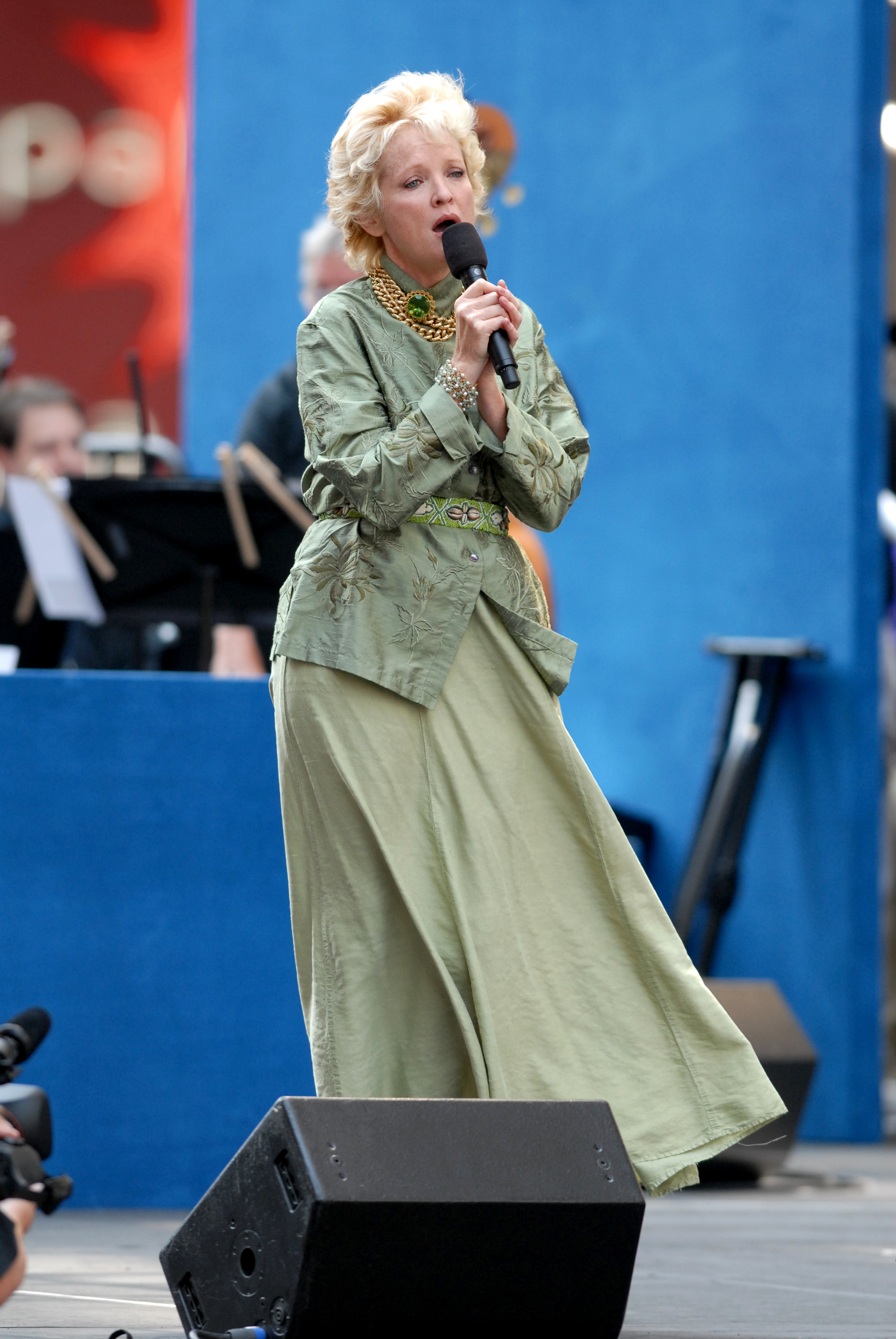
Ebersole performing in Broadway on Broadway, a free promotional concert for Broadway shows, 2006

In 2006, Ebersole took the dual roles of Edith Ewing Bouvier Beale ("Big Edie") and Edith Bouvier Beale ("Little Edie") in Grey Gardens, a musical based upon the film of the same name. After a sold-out off-Broadway run, Ebersole remained with the roles when the production moved to Broadway in November 2006, and remained with the show through its closing in July 2007. For this role, she won her second Tony Award for Best Leading Actress in a Musical. She appeared as Elvira in the 2009 Broadway revival of the Noël Coward comedy Blithe Spirit.

She appeared in the musical War Paint, which premiered at the Goodman Theatre in Chicago on June 28, 2016, for a run through August 2016. The show began previews at the Nederlander Theatre on Broadway on March 7, 2017, and opened on April 6, 2017. It closed on November 5, 2017. She played the role of Elizabeth Arden, opposite Patti LuPone as Helena Rubinstein. The musical had a book by Doug Wright with the music composed by Scott Frankel (music) and Michael Korie (lyrics).

=== Concerts ===
Ebersole appears in concerts and cabaret engagements at venues such as the Cinegrill and Cafe Carlyle. She won the 2010 Nightlife Award for Outstanding Cabaret Vocalist in a Major Engagement for her 2009 Café Carlyle cabaret. In 2009 she performed with Michael Feinstein at his club, Feinstein's at Loews Regency, (New York City) in a cabaret titled "Good Friends". She was one of the performers on the Playbill Cruise in September 2011. In November 2011, she performed for two sold-out nights at Birdland in New York City with jazz violinist Aaron Weinstein and his trio.

In 2015, Ebersole toured her show Big Noise from Winnetka, which included the 1938 jazz song Big Noise from Winnetka and a stop in Illinois.

=== Recording ===
She also has appeared on several albums. She was featured on the Bright Lights, Big City concept album. She also released an album of Noël Coward songs after browsing through them for scene change music for Blithe Spirit. She also voiced White Diamond in Steven Universe.

== Personal life ==
Ebersole has been married twice, to actor Peter Bergman from 1976 through 1981, and since 1988 to Bill Moloney, with whom she has adopted three children. She lives in Maplewood, New Jersey, with her family.

Ebersole claims to have experienced psychic phenomena. In 2012, Ebersole appeared on InfoWars' radio program The Alex Jones Show, expressing her misgivings about the Federal Reserve System and the Council on Foreign Relations. She has professed belief in the conspiracy theory that the September 11 attacks were carried out by the United States government.

== Filmography ==
=== Film ===
Year	Title	Role	Notes
1982	Tootsie	Linda	
1984	Amadeus	Caterina Cavalieri	
1984	Thief of Hearts	Janie Pointer	
1988	Mac and Me	Janet Cruise	
1990	Ghost Dad	Carol	
1991	Dead Again	Lydia Larsen	
1992	Folks!	Arlene Aldrich	
1992	The Lounge People	Cynthia Lewis	
1994	My Girl 2	Rose Zsigmond	
1994	Richie Rich	Regina Rich	
1996	Black Sheep	Governor Evelyn Tracy	
1996	Pie in the Sky	Mom Dunlap	
1997	'Til There Was You	Beebee Moss	
1999	My Favorite Martian	Mrs. Brown	
1999	True Crime	Bridget Rossiter	
2009	Confessions of a Shopaholic	TV show host	
2010	The Drawn Together Movie: The Movie!	Bossom Buddies Singer	
2013	The Big Wedding	Muffin	
2013	The Wolf of Wall Street	Leah Belfort	
2019	Steven Universe: The Movie	White Diamond	Voice role
2019	Driveways	Linda	
2021	Licorice Pizza	Lucille Doolittle	
2025	Is This Thing On?	Marilyn	
2026	Starbright	Grandmother	

=== Television ===
Year	Title	Role	Notes
1977–1980	Ryan's Hope	Lily Darnell	12 episodes
1981–1982	Saturday Night Live	Various	20 episodes
1982	Love, Sidney	Nurse Loring	Episode: "The Accident"
1983–1985	One Life to Live	Maxie McDermott	Unknown episodes
1984	The Dollmaker	Miss Vashinski	Television film
1986	Valerie	Barbara Goodwin	6 episodes
1986	Acceptable Risks	Lee Snyder	Television film
1986–1989	The Cavanaughs	Kit Cavanaugh	26 episodes
1990	American Dreamer	Kathleen	2 episodes
1990	Murphy Brown	Maddy	Episode: "The Bummer of 42"
1991	Empty Nest	Laura	Episode: "All About Harry"
1992	Rachel Gunn, R.N.	Rachel Gunn	13 episodes
1993	Dying to Love You	Cheryl New	Television film
1993	Gypsy	Tessie Tura	Television film
1996	Hey Arnold!	Lana Vail	Voice, episode: "Heat/Snow"
1998	Ally McBeal	Marie Stokes	Episode: "Just Looking"
1996	An Unexpected Family	Ruth Whitney	Television film
1998	Just Shoot Me!	Margo Langhorne	Episode: "How Nina Got Her Groove Back"
1999	Double Platinum	Peggy	Television film
2000	Mary and Rhoda	Cecile Andrews	Television film
2001	Will & Grace	Candy Pruitt	Episode: "Poker? I Don't Even Like Her"
2003	The Electric Piper	Pat Dixon	Voice, television film
2003	An Unexpected Love	Sandy	Television film
2004	Crossing Jordan	Mrs. Maguire	Episode: "Fire in the Sky"
2005–2006	Related	Renee	10 episodes
2008	Cashmere Mafia	Lily Parrish	2 episodes
2008	Boston Legal	Sunny Fields	Episode: "Indecent Proposals"
2008	Lipstick Jungle	Maureen	Chapter Fifteen: "The Sisterhood of the Traveling Prada"
2008	Law & Order: Special Victims Unit	Hilary Regnier	Episode: "Smut"
2009	Samantha Who?	Amy	Episode: "The Sister"
2009–2016	Royal Pains	Ms. Newberg	14 episodes
2010	Ugly Betty	Frances	Episode: "The Passion of the Betty"
2011	Retired at 35	Susan	4 episodes
2012–2014	Sullivan & Son	Carol Walsh	33 episodes
2013	American Horror Story: Coven	Anna-Lee Leighton	2 episodes
2015	Unbreakable Kimmy Schmidt	Helene	Episode "Kimmy's in a Love Triangle!"
2015–2018	Madam Secretary	First Lady Lydia Dalton	4 episodes
2016	Crisis in Six Scenes	Eve	Episode: "Episode 6"
2016	Search Party	Mariel	2 episodes
2018	Pose	Bobbi	Episode: "Giving and Receiving"
2018–2019	Steven Universe	White Diamond	Voice, 3 episodes
2018–2019	Blue Bloods	Lena Janko	3 episodes
2019–2024	Bob Hearts Abishola	Dorothy "Dottie" Wheeler	Main role
2020	Steven Universe Future	White Diamond	Voice, 2 episodes
2021	The Kominsky Method	Estelle	2 episodes, Season 3
2024	Accused	Debra	Episode: "Margot's Story"
2024	Holiday Touchdown: A Chiefs Love Story	Norma Young	Television film
2026	Elsbeth	Lydia Guðmundsdóttir	Episodes: "Consciously Unsistered" and "A Bad Lie"

=== Theatre ===
Year	Title	Role(s)	Venue	Ref.
1975–1976	Angel Street	Nancy (Replacement)	Lyceum Theatre	
1978–1979	On the 20th Century	Agnes (Understudy)	St. James Theatre	
1979–1980	Oklahoma!	Ado Annie	National Tour; Palace Theatre	
1980–1981	Camelot	Guenevere	National Tour; New York State Theatre	
1985	Harrigan 'N Hart	Greta Granville	Longacre Theatre	
1993	Paper Moon	Trixie Delight	Paper Mill Playhouse	
1994	Allegro	Emily	New York City Center	
1994	Lady in the Dark	Liza Elliott	New York City Center	
1996	Getting Away with Murder	Dossie Lustig	Broadhurst Theatre	
1999	Ziegfeld Follies of 1936	performer	New York City Center	
1999	Mame	Mame Dennis	Paper Mill Playhouse	
2000	Current Events	Diana	Manhattan Theatre Club	
2000	Gore Vidal's The Best Man	Mabel Cantwell	Virginia Theatre	
2000	A Connecticut Yankee	Morgan LeFay	New York City Center	
2001–2002	42nd Street	Dorothy Brock	Ford Center for the Performing Arts	
2002–2003	Dinner at Eight	Millicent Jordan	Vivian Beaumont Theatre	
2003	Talking Heads	Irene Ruddock	Minetta Lane Theatre	
2005	Steel Magnolias	M'Lynn	Lyceum Theatre	
2006–2007	Grey Gardens	Edith Bouvier Beale, Edith Ewing Bouvier Beale	Playwrights Horizons; Walter Kerr Theatre	
2008	Applause	Margo Channing	New York City Center	
2009	Blithe Spirit	Elvira	Shubert Theatre	
2014	Vanya and Sonia and Masha and Spike	Masha	Mark Taper Forum	
2015	Ever After	Baroness Rodmilla de Ghent	Paper Mill Playhouse	
2016	War Paint	Elizabeth Arden	Goodman Theatre	
2017	War Paint	Elizabeth Arden	Nederlander Theatre	

== Awards and nominations ==
Award	Year	Category	Nominated work	Result	Ref.
Daytime Emmy Award	1984	Outstanding Supporting Actress in a Drama Series	One Life to Live	Nominated	
Tony Awards	2001	Best Actress in a Musical	42nd Street	Won	
Tony Awards	2003	Best Featured Actress in a Play	Dinner at Eight	Nominated	
Tony Awards	2007	Best Actress in a Musical	Grey Gardens	Won	
Tony Awards	2017	Best Actress in a Musical	War Paint	Nominated	
Drama Desk Awards	2001	Outstanding Actress in a Musical	42nd Street	Nominated	
Drama Desk Awards	2003	Outstanding Featured Actress in a Play	Talking Heads	Nominated	
Drama Desk Awards	2006	Outstanding Actress in a Musical	Grey Gardens	Won	
Drama Desk Awards	2017	Outstanding Actress in a Musical	War Paint	Nominated	
Drama League Award	2006	Distinguished Performance	Grey Gardens	Won	
New York Drama Critics' Circle	2006	Special Citation	Grey Gardens	Honored	
Outer Critics Circle	2001	Outstanding Actress in a Musical	42nd Street	Won	
Outer Critics Circle	2003	Outstanding Actress in a Play	Dinner at Eight	Nominated	
Outer Critics Circle	2006	Outstanding Actress in a Musical	Grey Gardens	Won	
Outer Critics Circle	2017	Outstanding Actress in a Musical	War Paint	Nominated	

Media offices
Preceded by Brian Doyle-Murray as solo anchor	Weekend Update anchor with Brian Doyle-Murray; 1982	Succeeded by Brad Hall
