= TheatreWorksUSA =

Theater organization

Coordinates: 40°44′44.942″N 73°59′35.24″W

Theatreworks USA
- Formation: 1961
- Type: Theatre group
- Purpose: Children's theatre
- Location: New York City
- Website: www.theatreworksusa.org

TheatreWorksUSA is a professional, not-for-profit theatre for young and family audiences founded in 1961. The company is based out of New York City, but has touring productions that run through forty-nine states as well as parts of Canada. Plays and musicals produced by Theatreworks have reached over 90 million children, teachers and families since the company's founding.

== Free Summer Theatre ==
Since 1989 TheatreWorksUSA's Free Summer Theatre has provided young people and families with original, professional theatre free of charge. Each summer, tickets are distributed to children in over 200 social service and youth programs throughout the five boroughs. To date, over 300,000 children have attended free productions of some of the company's most popular shows, including Junie B. Jones, Romeo and Juliet, and Sarah, Plain and Tall. According to its own literature, TheatreWorks believes "all children should experience the excitement of going to the theatre, regardless of their financial circumstances." Roma Torre, a NY1 reporter, has said the following of the program:

TWUSA has done it again. Not only is the company's latest production yet another extremely delightful book adaptation for children—it's free. It's one splendid hour of music, laughter, life lessons and the art of putting on a show.

TheatreWorksUSA's production of The Civil War made its Off-Broadway debut at the Lucille Lortel Theatre for the 2013 Free Summer Theatre program. The Civil War ran from July 15, 2013, until August 16, 2013.

== Managed artists ==
In addition to their plays and musicals, TheatreWorksUSA offers educational presentations by artists and groups, for school and public performances. Included are historical productions, as well as stories, songs and dance from many cultures featuring authentic artists who entertain as well as teach about their traditions.

== Alumni artists ==
TheatreWorksUSA has a history of giving young actors, writers, directors, and designers their first professional job. Amongst the alumni are four-time Tony Award winning director Jerry Zaks, Robert Jess Roth (Beauty and the Beast), Michael Mayer (Thoroughly Modern Millie), Gabriel Barre; writers Marta Kauffman and David Crane (TV's Friends), Lynn Ahrens and Stephen Flaherty (Ragtime, Once on This Island), Jason Robert Brown (Parade), Larry O'Keefe (Bat Boy: The Musical), Double EGOT winner Robert Lopez and Jeff Marx (The Book of Mormon, Avenue Q); Kristen Anderson-Lopez (Disney's Frozen, with Lopez); and Tony-winning actors Roger Bart, Chuck Cooper, John Lloyd Young, and John Glover. Esteemed performers Jesse Tyler Ferguson, F. Murray Abraham, Daphne Rubin-Vega, Henry Winkler, Kathryn Boule and Judy Kuhn also got their start with Theatreworks.

== Awards ==
TheatreWorksUSA has won many awards in its long history. Some of these honors include:

- 2010 Drama Desk Award Nominee for Outstanding Lyrics for Click, Clack, Moo.
- 2010 Lucille Lortel Award Nominee for Outstanding Musical and Outstanding Choreography for Click, Clack, Moo.
- 2008 Lucille Lortel Award Nominee for Outstanding Revival, Outstanding Choreography and Outstanding Costumes for Seussical.
- 2008 Drama League Award Nominee for Outstanding Revival of a Musical for Seussical.
- 2005 Lucille Lortel Award Nominee for Best Musical and Best Choreography for Junie B. Jones.
- 2001 Jonathan Larson Performing Arts Foundation Award for "artistic vision and commitment to the support and development of theatre artists."
- 1996 Drama Desk Award given by New York theatre critics for Theatreworks' "35 years of providing quality entertainment to children and their parents.
- 1996 Lucille Lortel Award given by Off Broadway theatres and producers, for "Outstanding Special Achievement."
- 1996 Staw Hat Award for Best Play awarded to The Color of Justice.
- 1984 AUDELCO Award at the Twelfth Annual Black Theatre Awards for Play to Win, a musical about Jackie Robinson breaking the color barrier in major league baseball. The award was for "best writing of a new show by black authors for the non-commercial theatre."

== Chelsea Studios ==
In 2000, TheatreWorksUSA established Chelsea Studios, a rehearsal studio in the Chelsea neighborhood of Manhattan. In addition to providing rehearsal space for TheatreWorksUSA's productions, Chelsea also rents its studios out to casting agents, touring productions, exercise classes, and various other clients.
