= Kathleen Marshall =

American choreographer, director, and creative consultant

- Born: September 28, 1962 (age 64); Madison, Wisconsin, U.S.
- Education: Smith College (1985)
- Occupations: Choreographer, creative consultant, theatre director
- Years active: 1993–present
- Spouse: Scott Landis (m. 2009)
- Children: 2
- Relatives: Rob Marshall (brother)

Kathleen Marshall (born September 28, 1962) is an American director, choreographer, and creative consultant.

== Early life, family and education ==
Born in Madison, Wisconsin, Marshall graduated from Taylor Allderdice High School in Pittsburgh, Pennsylvania in 1980. She attended Smith College in Massachusetts, graduating in 1985.

== Career ==
Marshall worked in the Pittsburgh theatre scene when she was younger, performing with such companies as Pittsburgh Civic Light Opera. She began her Broadway career as an assistant to her brother Rob, the choreographer of Kiss of the Spider Woman, in 1993. The two also collaborated on She Loves Me (1993), Damn Yankees (1994), Victor/Victoria (1995) and Seussical (2000). She was the artistic director for the Encores! series of staged musical revivals from 1996 through 2000. During that time, she choreographed The Boys from Syracuse, Li'l Abner and Call Me Madam and both directed and choreographed Babes in Arms and Wonderful Town. Marshall was a judge on the NBC reality series Grease: You're the One That I Want!. Viewers' votes selected the stars of the August 2007 Broadway revival of Grease, which she directed and choreographed.

The Encores! production of Wonderful Town transferred to Broadway in November 2003 and ran until January 2005, with both direction and choreography by Marshall. She was nominated for the Tony Award for Best Direction of a Musical and Best Choreography, and won for Best Choreography. She was the director and choreographer of the Broadway revival of Pajama Game which opened in February 2006 and which was the Broadway acting debut of Harry Connick Jr.

Marshall directed and choreographed a Broadway revival of Cole Porter's Anything Goes beginning in April 2011, with Sutton Foster starring as Reno Sweeney. Marshall was nominated for the Tony Award for both directing and choreography and won for choreography. She was the director and choreographer of the musical Nice Work If You Can Get It which opened on Broadway in April 2012.

She directed the musical adaptation of the film, Ever After, for Papermill Playhouse’s 2015-16 season. She directed the new television movie of Once Upon a Mattress which was broadcast on ABC in December 2005. In 2021, Marshall served as the director and choreographer for the London revival of Anything Goes at the Barbican Theatre. For her work in the production, she won the Laurence Olivier Award for Best Theatre Choreographer. In 2023, Marshall directed and choreographed the world premiere of Sinatra: The Musical at the Birmingham Repertory Theatre.

== Personal life ==
In February 2009, Marshall received the Smith College Medal in honor of her work.

Marshall and Scott Landis, a producer and former agent, were married in September 2009. They have two children, Ella and Nathaniel, twins, who were born in May 2010.

== Stage productions ==
Source: Internet Broadway Database

- Swinging on a Star (1995) – choreographer
- 1776 (1997) – choreographer
- Kiss Me, Kate (1999) – choreographer
- Ring Round the Moon (1999) – choreographer
- Follies (2001) – choreographer
- Wonderful Town (2003) – director/choreographer
- Little Shop of Horrors (2003) – choreographer
- Two Gentlemen of Verona (2005) - director/choreographer, Public Theater
- The Pajama Game (2006) – director/choreographer
- Grease (2007) director/choreographer
- Calvin Berger (2010) director/choreographer, George Street Playhouse, New Brunswick, New Jersey
- Anything Goes (2011) director/choreographer
- Nice Work If You Can Get It (2012) director/choreographer
- In Transit, (2016) director/choreographer
- Anything Goes (2021) director/choreographer, Barbican Theatre
- Sinatra: The Musical (2023) director/choreographer, Birmingham Repertory Theatre

== Awards and nominations ==
Year	Award ceremony	Category	Nominee	Result
1996	Drama Desk Awards	Outstanding Choreography	Swinging on a Star	Nominated
2000	Tony Award	Best Choreography	Kiss Me, Kate	Nominated
2000	Drama Desk Awards	Outstanding Choreography	Kiss Me, Kate	Nominated
2000	Outer Critics Circle Award	Outstanding Choreography	Kiss Me, Kate	Nominated
2001	Outer Critics Circle Award	Outstanding Choreography	Follies	Nominated
2002	Laurence Olivier Awards	Best Theatre Choreographer	Kiss Me, Kate	Nominated
2003	Primetime Emmy Awards	Outstanding Choreography	The Music Man	Nominated
2004	Tony Award	Best Direction of a Musical	Wonderful Town	Nominated
2004	Tony Award	Best Choreography	Wonderful Town	Won
2004	Drama Desk Award	Outstanding Director of a Musical	Wonderful Town	Nominated
2004	Drama Desk Award	Outstanding Choreography	Wonderful Town	Won
2004	Outer Critics Circle Award	Outstanding Director of a Musical	Wonderful Town	Nominated
2004	Outer Critics Circle Award	Outstanding Choreography	Wonderful Town	Won
2006	Tony Award	Best Direction of a Musical	The Pajama Game	Nominated
2006	Tony Award	Best Choreography	The Pajama Game	Won
2006	Drama Desk Award	Outstanding Director of a Musical	The Pajama Game	Nominated
2006	Drama Desk Award	Outstanding Choreography	The Pajama Game	Won
2006	Outer Critics Circle Award	Outstanding Director of a Musical	The Pajama Game	Nominated
2006	Outer Critics Circle Award	Outstanding Choreography	The Pajama Game	Won
2011	Tony Award	Best Direction of a Musical	Anything Goes	Nominated
2011	Tony Award	Best Choreography	Anything Goes	Won
2011	Drama Desk Award	Outstanding Director of a Musical	Anything Goes	Nominated
2011	Drama Desk Award	Outstanding Choreography	Anything Goes	Won
2011	Outer Critics Circle Award	Outstanding Director of a Musical	Anything Goes	Nominated
2011	Outer Critics Circle Award	Outstanding Choreography	Anything Goes	Won
2011	Astaire Awards	Outstanding Choreographer in a Broadway Show	Anything Goes	Nominated
2012	Tony Award	Best Direction of a Musical	Nice Work If You Can Get It	Nominated
2012	Tony Award	Best Choreography	Nice Work If You Can Get It	Nominated
2012	Drama Desk Award	Outstanding Director of a Musical	Nice Work If You Can Get It	Nominated
2012	Drama Desk Award	Outstanding Choreography	Nice Work If You Can Get It	Nominated
2012	Outer Critics Circle Award	Outstanding Director of a Musical	Nice Work If You Can Get It	Nominated
2012	Outer Critics Circle Award	Outstanding Choreography	Nice Work If You Can Get It	Nominated
2012	Astaire Awards	Outstanding Choreographer in a Broadway Show	Nice Work If You Can Get It	Nominated
2022	Laurence Olivier Awards	Best Director	Anything Goes	Nominated
2022	Laurence Olivier Awards	Best Theatre Choreographer	Anything Goes	Won
