= List of Reading Rainbow episodes =

This is a list of Reading Rainbow episodes, hosted by longtime executive producer LeVar Burton. The show premiered on PBS on July 11, 1983. The final episode aired on November 10, 2006, reruns ceased on August 28, 2009. On June 20, 2012, an app for the show was released. On October 4, 2025, the show was revived, now hosted by Mychal Threets.

== Episodes ==
=== Season 1 (1983) ===
All episodes this season were directed by Larry Lancit.

No. overall	No. in season	Title	Written by	Narrated by	Original release date	Prod. code
1	1	"Tight Times"	Ellen Schecter	Patrick McCaffrey	July 11, 1983	101
Feature Book: Tight Times by Barbara Shook Hazen, pictures by Trina Schart Hyman Review Books: When I Was Young in the Mountains by Cynthia Rylant, illustrated by Diane Goode; Pet Show! by Ezra Jack Keats; The Terrible Thing That Happened at Our House by Marge Blaine, pictures by John C. Wallner
2	2	"Miss Nelson is Back"	Ellen Schecter	Ruth Buzzi	July 12, 1983	102
Feature Book: Miss Nelson is Back by Harry Allard and James Marshall Review Books: Grandmama's Joy by Eloise Greenfield, illustrated by Carole Byard; Daddy is a Monster...Sometimes by John Steptoe; Harlequin and the Gift of Many Colors by Remy Charlip and Burton Supree
3	3	"Bea and Mr. Jones"	Ellen Schecter	Madeline Kahn	July 13, 1983	103
Feature Book: Bea and Mr. Jones by Amy Schwartz Review Books: Max by Rachel Isadora; There's a Nightmare in My Closet by Mercer Mayer; The Ugly Duckling by Hans Christian Andersen, retold and illustrated by Lorinda Bryan Cauley
4	4	"Bringing the Rain to Kapiti Plain"	Lou Berger	James Earl Jones	July 14, 1983	104
Feature Book: Bringing the Rain to Kapiti Plain by Verna Aardema, pictures by Beatriz Vidal Review Books: The Cloud Book by Tomie de Paola; Rain by Peter Spier; A Story, a Story by Gail E. Haley
5	5	"Louis the Fish"	Lou Berger	Vincent Gardenia	July 15, 1983	105
Feature Book: Louis the Fish by Arthur Yorinks, pictures by Richard Egielski Review Books: Where the Wild Things Are by Maurice Sendak; A Fish Hatches by Joanna Cole and Jerome Wexler; One Monday Morning by Uri Shulevitz
6	6	"Digging Up Dinosaurs"	Lou Berger	Linda Gelman	July 18, 1983	106
Feature Book: Digging Up Dinosaurs by Aliki Jerry Stiller guest stars as the voice of a dinosaur comedian. Review Books: Dinosaur Time by Peggy Parish, pictures by Arnold Lobel; If You Are a Hunter of Fossils by Byrd Baylor, illustrated by Peter Parnall; Dinosaurs!: A Drawing Book by Michael Emberley
7	7	"Liang and the Magic Paintbrush"	Ellen Schecter	Lauren Tom	July 19, 1983	107
Feature Book: Liang and the Magic Paintbrush by Demi Review Books: Emma by Wendy Kesselman, illustrated by Barbara Cooney; Ben's Trumpet by Rachel Isadora; If You Take a Pencil by Fulvio Testa
8	8	"Gila Monsters Meet You at the Airport"	Ellen Schecter	Douglas Parvin	July 20, 1983	108
Feature Book: Gila Monsters Meet You at the Airport by Marjorie Weinman Sharmat, pictures by Byron Barton Review Books: Peter's Chair by Ezra Jack Keats; The Big Hello by Janet Schulman, illustrated by Lillian Hoban; Mitchell is Moving by Marjorie Weinman Sharmat, pictures by Jose Aruego and Ariane Dewey
9	9	"Three Days on a River in a Red Canoe"	Ellen Schecter	Carolyn McMahon	July 21, 1983	109
Feature Book: Three Days on a River in a Red Canoe Review Books: Worlds to Explore; Today We Are Brother and Sister; Anno's Journey
10	10	"The Gift of the Sacred Dog"	Ellen Schecter	Michael Ansara	July 22, 1983	110
Feature Book: The Gift of the Sacred Dog Review Books: Moonsong Lullaby; Why Mosquitoes Buzz in People's Ears; Suho and the White Horse
11	11	"Gregory the Terrible Eater"	Mark Saltzman	Marilyn Michaels	July 25, 1983	111
Feature Book: Gregory the Terrible Eater by Mitchell Sharmat, illustrated by Jose Aruego and Ariane Dewey Review Books: Mrs. Pig's Bulk Buy by Mary Rayner; Better Homes and Gardens New Junior Cook Book; Poem Stew selected by William Cole, pictures by Karen Ann Weinhaus
12	12	"Three by the Sea"	Ellen Schecter	Chicago City Limits	July 26, 1983	112
Feature Book: Three by the Sea Review Books: Regards to the Man in the Moon; Frog and Toad Together; Come Away from the Water, Shirley
13	13	"Arthur's Eyes"	Ellen Schecter	Bill Cosby	July 27, 1983	113
Feature Book: Arthur's Eyes Review Books: A Show of Hands; Through Grandpa's Eyes; Is This a Baby Dinosaur?
14	14	"The Day Jimmy's Boa Ate the Wash"	Mark Saltzman	Kaleena Kiff and Laura Hicks	July 28, 1983	114
Feature Book: The Day Jimmy's Boa Ate the Wash by Trinka Hakes Noble, pictures by Steven Kellogg Review Books: Alexander and the Terrible, Horrible, No Good, Very Bad Day by Judith Viorst, illustrated by Ray Cruz; "Could Be Worse!" by James Stevenson; Crictor by Tomi Ungerer
15	15	"Ty's One-Man Band"	Ellen Schecter	Lou Rawls	July 29, 1983	115
Feature Book: Ty's One-Man Band by Mildred Pitts Walter, illustrations by Margot Tomes Review Books: The Banza by Diane Wolkstein, pictures by Marc Brown; The Amazing Bone by William Steig; Making Musical Things by Ann Wiseman

=== Season 2 (1984) ===
All episodes this season were directed by Larry Lancit.

No. overall	No. in season	Title	Written by	Narrated by	Original release date	Prod. code
16	1	"Hot-Air Henry"	Ellen Schecter	William Windom	July 16, 1984	201
Feature Book: Hot-Air Henry by Mary Calhoun, illustrated by Erick Ingraham Review Books: Easy-to-Make Spaceships that Really Fly by Mary and Dewey Blocksma, illustrated by Marisabina Russo; The Big Balloon Race by Eleanor Coerr, pictures by Carolyn Croll; Just Us Women by Jeannette Caines, illustrated by Pat Cummings
17	2	"Simon's Book"	Ellen Schecter	Ruby Dee	July 17, 1984	202
Feature Book: Simon's Book by Henrik Drescher LeVar meets the author, Henrik Drescher, and learns how books are made. Review Books: Begin at the Beginning by Amy Schwartz; What's Under My Bed? by James Stevenson; Me and Neesie by Eloise Greenfield, illustrated by Moneta Barnett
18	3	"Ox-Cart Man"	Ronnie Krauss & Ellen Schecter	Lorne Greene	July 18, 1984	203
Feature Book: Ox-Cart Man by Donald Hall, pictures by Barbara Cooney Review Books: Round Trip by Ann Jonas; A Winter Place by Ruth Yaffe Radin, paintings by Mattie Lou O'Kelley; Wagon Wheels by Barbara Brenner, pictures by Don Bolognese
19	4	"Mystery on the Docks"	Ellen Schecter	Raul Julia	July 19, 1984	204
Feature Book: Mystery on the Docks Review Books: Big City Port; The Wreck of the Zephyr; Nate the Great Mystery series
20	5	"A Chair for My Mother"	Ellen Schecter	Amy Linker	July 20, 1984	205
Feature Book: A Chair for My Mother by Vera B. Williams Review Books: My Mama Needs Me by Mildred Pitts Walter, pictures by Pat Cummings; I Have a Sister, My Sister is Deaf by Jeanne Whitehouse Peterson, pictures by Deborah Kogan Ray; Everett Anderson's Goodbye by Lucille Clifton, illustrated by Ann Grifalconi

=== Season 3 (1985) ===
All episodes this season were directed by Larry Lancit.

No. overall	No. in season	Title	Written by	Narrated by	Original release date	Prod. code
21	1	"Paul Bunyan"	Lydia Wilen	Buddy Ebsen	June 24, 1985	301
Feature Book: Paul Bunyan Review Books: The Legend of the Bluebonnet; Whale in the Sky; The Star-Spangled Banner
22	2	"The Patchwork Quilt"	Ellen Schecter	Isabel Sanford	June 25, 1985	302
Feature Book: The Patchwork Quilt Review Books: Being Adopted; Angel Child, Dragon Child; The Two of Them
23	3	"Hill of Fire"	Ronnie Krauss	Fernando Escandon	June 26, 1985	303
Feature Book: Hill of Fire Review Books: Emma's Dragon Hunt; Ed Emberley's Science Flip Books; The Tamarindo Puppy and Other Poems
24	4	"The Tortoise and the Hare"	Ellen Schecter	Gilda Radner	June 27, 1985	304
Feature Book: The Tortoise and the Hare Review Books: Albert the Running Bear's Exercise Book; Hooray for Snail!; Sam Johnson and the Blue Ribbon Quilt
25	5	"Perfect the Pig"	Lydia Wilen	James Coco	June 28, 1985	305
Feature Book: Perfect the Pig Review Books: The Bionic Bunny Show; Hector the Accordion-Nosed Dog; Poinsettia and Her Family

=== Season 4A (1985-86) ===
All episodes were directed by Hugh Martin.

No. overall	No. in season	Title	Written by	Narrated by	Original release date	Prod. code
26	1	"Animal Cafe"	Mark Saltzman	Martin Short (Season 3 leftover)	June 23, 1986	306
Feature Book: Animal Cafe Review Books: The Dream Eater; The Moon; Night Markets: Bringing Food to a City
27	2	"Alistair in Outer Space"	Ronnie Krauss	Arnold Stang	June 24, 1986	307
Feature Book: Alistair in Outer Space Review Books: Maps and Globes; Commander Toad series; Check It Out!: The Book About Libraries
28	3	"Feelings"	Ellen Schecter	Raima Evans, Jessica Mercado, Laura Haymann, Paul Sidoriak, Jonathan Rose, Timothy Oakes, Jerry David, and Pamela Stogner	June 25, 1986	308
Feature Book: Feelings by Aliki Review Books: Fireflies! by Julie Brinckloe; Loudmouth George and the Sixth-Grade Bully by Nancy Carlson; Honey, I Love and Other Love Poems by Eloise Greenfield, pictures by Diane and Leo Dillon
29	4	"Watch the Stars Come Out"	Peter Barton	Laura Haymann (Season 3 leftover)	June 26, 1986	309
Feature Book: Watch the Stars Come Out by Riki Levinson, illustrated by Diane Goode Review Books: The Island of the Skog by Steven Kellogg; The Long Way to a New Land by Joan Sandin; Molly's Pilgrim by Barbara Cohen, illustrated by Michael J. Deraney
30	5	"Mama Don't Allow"	Peter Barton	Fred Newman	June 27, 1986	310
Feature Book: Mama Don't Allow by Thacher Hurd Review Books: Miranda by Tricia Tusa; Apt. 3 by Ezra Jack Keats; Alligator Shoes by Arthur Dorros

=== Season 4B (1986) ===
No. overall	No. in season	Title	Directed by	Written by	Narrated by	Original release date	Prod. code
31	6	"Space Case"	Hugh Martin	Ellen Schecter	Michael Winslow	August 4, 1986	401
Feature Book: Space Case by Edward Marshall, pictures by James Marshall Review Books: Astronuts: Space Jokes and Riddles compiled by Charles Keller, illustrated by Art Cumings; Legend of the Milky Way retold and illustrated by Jeanne M. Lee; Is There Life in Outer Space? by Franklyn M. Branley, illustrated by Don Madden
32	7	"The Milk Makers"	Hugh Martin	Patti Sullivan	Alaina Reed	August 5, 1986	402
Feature Book: The Milk Makers by Gail Gibbons Review Books: Whales and Other Sea Mammals by Elsa Posell; From Blossom to Honey by Ali Mitgutsch; Baby Animals on the Farm by Hans Heinrich-Isenbart, photographs by Ruth Rau
33	8	"Imogene's Antlers"	Mitchell Geller	Joan Wilen, Lydia Wilen & Patti Sullivan	Imogene Coca	August 6, 1986	403
Feature Book: Imogene's Antlers Review Books: George Shrinks by William Joyce; The Trek by Ann Jonas; When Panda Came to Our House by Helen Zane Jensen
34	9	"Germs Make Me Sick!"	Hugh Martin	Ronnie Krauss	Molly Mandlin	August 7, 1986	404
Feature Book: Germs Make Me Sick! by Melvin Berger, illustrated by Marylin Hafner Review Books: Guess What? by Beau Gardner; The Microscope by Maxine Kumin, pictures by Arnold Lobel; Teddy Bears Cure a Cold by Susanna Gretz, illustrated by Alison Sage
35	10	"Abiyoyo"	Larry Lancit & Mitchell Geller	Mark Saltzman	Pete Seeger	August 8, 1986	405
LeVar meets the author, folk singer Pete Seeger, who adapted the story from an old African folk tale as a bedtime story for his children. Feature Book: Abiyoyo Review Books: Blackberry Ink; Ayu and the Perfect Moon; Peter and the Wolf

=== Season 5A (1986-87) ===
All episodes were directed by Mitchell Geller.

No. overall	No. in season	Title	Written by	Narrated by	Original release date	Prod. code
36	1	"The Life Cycle of the Honeybee"	Ronnie Krauss	Barbara Feldon	June 1, 1987	406
Feature Book: The Life Cycle of the Honeybee by Paula Z. Hogan, illustrations by Geri K. Strigenz Review Books: The Reason for a Flower by Ruth Heller; The Lady and the Spider by Faith McNulty, illustrated by Bob Marstall; Going Buggy!: Jokes About Insects by Peter and Connie Roop, pictures by Joan Hanson
37	2	"Keep the Lights Burning, Abbie"	Ellen Schecter	Sada Thompson	June 2, 1987	407
Feature Book: Keep the Lights Burning, Abbie by Peter and Connie Roop, pictures by Peter E. Hanson Review Books: Very Last First Time by Jan Andrews, illustrated by Ian Wallace; Sailing with the Wind by Thomas Locker; The Little Red Lighthouse and the Great Gray Bridge by Hildegarde H. Swift and Lynd Ward
38	3	"Chickens Aren't the Only Ones"	Mark Eisman	Georgia Engel	June 3, 1987	408
Feature Book: Chickens Aren't the Only Ones by Ruth Heller Review Books: Mrs. Huggins and Her Hen Hannah by Lydia Dabcovich; Egg to Chick by Millicent E. Selsam, pictures by Barbara Wolff; Turtle and Tortoise by Vincent Serventy from the Animals in the Wild series
39	4	"The Paper Crane"	Ellen Schecter	Keye Luke	June 4, 1987	409
Feature Book: The Paper Crane Review Books: "Paper" Through the Ages; Perfect Crane; How My Parents Learned to Eat
40	5	"The Runaway Duck"	Jeanne Marie Laskas	Orson Bean	June 5, 1987	410
Feature Book: The Runaway Duck by David Lyon Review Books: Dabble Duck by Anne Leo Ellis, illustrated by Sue Truesdell; Jamaica's Find by Juanita Havill, illustrations by Anne Sibley O'Brien; The Story About Ping by Marjorie Flack and Kurt Wiese

=== Season 5B (1987) ===
All episodes were directed by Vern Oakley.

No. overall	No. in season	Title	Written by	Narrated by	Original release date	Prod. code
41	6	"A Three Hat Day"	Mark Saltzman	Zelda Rubinstein	July 27, 1987	411
Feature Book: A Three Hat Day by Laura B. Geringer, pictures by Arnold Lobel Review Books: Caps for Sale by Esphyr Slobodkina; Maebelle's Suitcase by Tricia Tusa; Shoes by Elizabeth Winthrop, illustrated by William Joyce
42	7	"Rumpelstiltskin"	Jill Gluckson	Ralph Waite	July 28, 1987	412
Feature Book: Rumpelstiltskin retold and illustrated by Paul O. Zelinsky Review Books: A Medieval Feast by Aliki; The Story of a Castle by John S. Goodall; The Sleeping Beauty retold and illustrated by Mercer Mayer
43	8	"Best Friends"	Ronnie Krauss	Liza Siegler	July 29, 1987	413
Feature Book: Best Friends by Steven Kellogg Review Books: The Story of Mrs. Lovewright and Purrless Her Cat by Lore Segal, illustrated by Paul O. Zelinsky; A Gift for Tia Rosa by Karen T. Taha, illustrated by Dee deRosa; The Puppy Who Wanted a Boy by Jane Thayer, illustrated by Lisa McCue
44	9	"Meanwhile Back at the Ranch"	Ronnie Krauss	Hoyt Axton	July 30, 1987	414
Feature Book: Meanwhile Back at the Ranch by Trinka Hakes Noble, pictures by Tony Ross Review Books: Dakota Dugout by Ann Turner, illustrated by Ronald Himler; Bossyboots by David Cox; Rodeo by Cheryl Walsh Bellville
45	10	"My Little Island"	Ronnie Krauss	Ron Foster	July 31, 1987	415
Feature Book: My Little Island by Frane Lessac Review Books: Yagua Days by Cruz Martel, pictures by Jerry Pinkney; Nicholas Bentley Stoningpot III by Ann McGovern, illustrated by Tomie de Paola; The Viking Children's World Atlas by Jacqueline Tivers and Michael Day

=== Season 6A (1988) ===
No. overall	No. in season	Title	Directed by	Written by	Narrated by	Original release date	Prod. code
46	1	"The Bionic Bunny Show"	Dean Parisot	Ellis Weiner	Gene Klavan	August 15, 1988	501
Feature Book: The Bionic Bunny Show by Laurene Krasny Brown and Marc Brown LeVar visits the set of Star Trek: The Next Generation and talks about his role as Lt. Geordi LeForge Review Books: Lights! Camera! Action!: How a Movie is Made by Gail Gibbons; The Philharmonic Gets Dressed by Karla Kuskin, illustrations by Marc Simont; Ramona: Behind the Scenes of a Television Show by Elaine Scott, photographs by Margaret Miller
47	2	"Bugs"	Mark Mannucci	Ronnie Krauss	Lori Delgado and Edwin Maldonado Jr.	August 16, 1988	502
Feature Book: Bugs Review Books: Backyard Insects; Ladybug; Ant Cities
48	3	"The Robbery at the Diamond Dog Diner"	Dean Parisot & Larry Lancit	Ellis Weiner	Peter Falk	August 17, 1988	503
Feature Book: The Robbery at the Diamond Dog Diner by Eileen Christelow Review Books: Aunt Eater Loves a Mystery by Doug Cushman; Better Homes and Gardens Step-by-Step Kids' Cookbook; A Cache of Jewels and Other Collective Nouns by Ruth Heller
49	4	"Brush"	Larry Lancit	Mark Saltzman	Héctor Elizondo	August 18, 1988	504
Feature Book: Brush Review Books: What the Mailman Brought; Jumanji; Egg-Carton Zoo
50	5	"The Purple Coat"	Hugh Martin	Ellis Weiner	Jack Gilford	August 19, 1988	505
Feature Book: The Purple Coat by Amy Hest, pictures by Amy Schwartz Review Books: Pablo Picasso by Ibi Lepscky, illustrated by Paolo Cardoni; How a Book is Made by Aliki; The Goat in the Rug by Charles L. Blood and Martin Link, illustrated by Nancy Winslow Parker

=== Season 6B (1988-89) ===
No. overall	No. in season	Title	Directed by	Written by	Narrated by	Original release date	Prod. code
51	6	"Barn Dance!"	Hugh Martin	Andrew Gutelle	Roy Clark	March 27, 1989	506
Feature Book: Barn Dance! by Bill Martin, Jr. and John Archambault, illustrated by Ted Rand Review Books: Half a Moon and One Whole Star by Crescent Dragonwagon, illustrations by Jerry Pinkney; I Like the Music by Leah Komaiko, pictures by Barbara Westman; The Old Banjo by Dennis Haseley, drawings by Stephen Gammell
52	7	"Duncan and Dolores"	Ed Wiseman	Loriann Champagne Smith	Jane Curtin	March 28, 1989	507
Feature Book: Duncan and Dolores by Barbara Samuels Review Books: Puss in Boots by Charles Perrault, retold and illustrated by Lorinda Bryan Cauley; Cat and Canary by Michael Foreman; Moon Tiger by Phyllis Root, art by Ed Young
53	8	"Knots on a Counting Rope"	Hugh Martin	Ellen Schecter	J. Ruben Silverbird and Kenneth Blank	March 29, 1989	508
Feature Book: Knots on a Counting Rope by Bill Martin, Jr. and John Archambault, illustrated by Ted Rand Review Books: Harriet's Recital by Nancy Carlson; Let's Go Swimming with Mr. Sillypants by M.K. Brown; Owl Moon by Jane Yolen, illustrated by John Schoenherr
54	9	"Mummies Made in Egypt"	Larry Lancit	Cecily Truett	Corinne Orr	March 30, 1989	509
Feature Book: Mummies Made in Egypt by Aliki Review Books: I Can Be an Archaeologist by Robert B. Pickering from the I Can Be series; Bill and Pete Go Down the Nile by Tomie de Paola; Visiting the Art Museum by Laurene Krasny Brown and Marc Brown
55	10	"Mufaro's Beautiful Daughters"	Mark Mannucci	David Yazbek	Phylicia Rashad	March 31, 1989	510
Feature Book: Mufaro's Beautiful Daughters Review Books: Jambo Means Hello: A Swahili Alphabet Book; Jafta series; Who's in Rabbit's House?

=== Season 7A (1989) ===
No. overall	No. in season	Title	Directed by	Written by	Narrated by	Original release date	Prod. code
56	1	"Humphrey the Lost Whale: A True Story"	Dean Parisot	Jill Gluckson	Jane Pauley	July 3, 1989	601
Feature Book: Humphrey the Lost Whale: A True Story Review Books: All About Whales by Dorothy Hinshaw Patent; Whalewatch! by June Behrens, photographs by John Olguin; The Life Cycle of the Whale by Paula Z. Hogan, illustrations by Karen Halt
57	2	"Stay Away from the Junkyard!"	Mark Mannucci	Ronnie Krauss	Michele Mariana	July 4, 1989	602
Feature Book: Stay Away from the Junkyard! Review Books: Make Way for Ducklings; The Snowy Day; The Story of Ferdinand
58	3	"Little Nino's Pizzeria"	Mark Mannucci	Andrew Gutelle	Josh Saviano	July 5, 1989	603
Feature Book: Little Nino's Pizzeria by Karen Barbour Review Books: Eats Poems by Arnold Adoff, illustrated by Susan Russo; What Happens to a Hamburger? by Paul Showers, illustrated by Anne Rockwell; The Popcorn Book by Tomie de Paola
59	4	"Ludlow Laughs"	Dean Parisot	Mitchell Kriegman	Phyllis Diller	July 6, 1989	604
Feature Book: Ludlow Laughs by Jon Agee Review Books: Pig William by Arlene Dubanevich; The Make Me Laugh! Joke Books, illustrated by Joan Hanson; Shake My Sillies Out: A Raffi Song to Read, illustrated by David Allender
60	5	"Dinosaur Bob and His Adventures with the Family Lazardo"	Ed Wiseman	Jill Gluckson	Edward Asner	July 7, 1989	605
Feature Book: Dinosaur Bob and His Adventures with the Family Lazardo by William Joyce LeVar meets the Oakland Athletics during spring practice. Review Books: Casey at the Bat by Ernest Lawrence Thayer, illustrated by Ken Bachaus; Old Turtle's Baseball Stories by Leonard Kessler; Ronald Morgan Goes to Bat by Patricia Reilly Giff, illustrated by Susanna Natti

=== Season 7B (1989-90) ===
No. overall	No. in season	Title	Directed by	Written by	Narrated by	Original release date	Prod. code
61	6	"Dive to the Coral Reefs"	Mark Mannucci	Ronnie Krauss	Fran Brill	March 26, 1990	606
Feature Book: Dive to the Coral Reefs Review Books: Creatures of the Sea; How to Hide an Octopus and Other Sea Creatures; I Can Be an Oceanographer from the I Can Be series
62	7	"Desert Giant: The World of the Saguaro Cactus"	Dean Parisot	Ronnie Krauss	Philip Bosco	March 27, 1990	607
Feature Book: Desert Giant: The World of the Saguaro Cactus by Barbara Bash Review Books: Snakes Are Hunters by Patricia Lauber, illustrated by Holly Keller; Cactus by Cynthia Overbeck Bix, photographs by Shabo Hani; A Living Desert by Guy J. Spencer, photographs by Tim Fuller
63	8	"Tooth-Gnasher Superflash"	Hugh Martin	Andrew Gutelle	Victoria Jackson	March 28, 1990	608
Feature Book: Tooth-Gnasher Superflash Review Books: Fill It Up!: All About Service Stations; Tin Lizzie and Little Nell; Truck Song
64	9	"Bored - Nothing to Do!"	Larry Lancit	Ronnie Krauss	Alex Borg and David Hyman	March 29, 1990	609
Feature Book: Bored - Nothing to Do! Review Books: The Magic Wings; Redbird; Flying from the Let's Discover Library
65	10	"Sports Pages"	Ed Wiseman	Jill Gluckson	LeVar Burton	March 30, 1990	610
Feature Book: Sports Pages by Arnold Adoff, illustrations by Steve Kuzma Review Books: Miss Nelson Has a Field Day by Harry Allard and James Marshall; Making the Team by Nancy Carlson; Soccer Sam by Jean Marzollo, illustrated by Blanche Sims

=== Season 8 (1990) ===
No. overall	No. in season	Title	Directed by	Written by	Narrated by	Original release date	Prod. code
66	1	"The Magic School Bus Inside the Earth"	Mark Mannucci	Andrew Gutelle	Keshia Knight Pulliam	September 10, 1990	701
Feature Book: The Magic School Bus Inside the Earth by Joanna Cole, illustrated by Bruce Degen Review Books: Caves by Roma Gans, illustrated by Giulio Maestro; How to Dig a Hole to the Other Side of the World by Faith McNulty, pictures by Marc Simont; Rock Collecting by Roma Gans, illustrated by Holly Keller
67	2	"Jack, the Seal and the Sea"	Hugh Martin	Ronnie Krauss	Leslie Uggams	September 11, 1990	702
Feature Book: Jack, the Seal and the Sea by Gerald Aschenbrenner, English adaptation by Joanne Fink Review Books: Sterling: The Rescue of a Baby Harbor Seal by Sandra Verrill White and Michael Filisky; Water: What It Is, What It Does by Judith S. Seixas, illustrated by Tom Huffman; A Day in the Life of a Marine Biologist by David Paige, photographs by Roger Ruhlin
68	3	"The Bicycle Man"	Ed Wiseman	Ronnie Krauss	Tom Matsusaka	September 12, 1990	703
Feature Book: The Bicycle Man by Allen Say Review Books: Delphine by Molly Bang; The White Bicycle by Rob Lewis; Our Teacher's in a Wheelchair by Mary Ellen Powers
69	4	"Florence and Eric Take the Cake"	Mark Mannucci	Andrew Gutelle	Julia Child	September 13, 1990	704
Feature Book: Florence and Eric Take the Cake by Jocelyn Wild Review Books: Uncle Nacho's Hat adapted by Harriet Rohmer, illustrations by Veg Reisberg; My First Cook Book by Angela Wilkes; The Garden of Abdul Gasazi by Chris Van Allsburg
70	5	"Sunken Treasure"	Larry Lancit	Andrew Gutelle	Robert Morse	September 14, 1990	705
Feature Book: Sunken Treasure Review Books: What's in the Deep?: An Underwater Adventure for Children; A Day Underwater; The Titanic...Lost and Found

=== Season 9 (1991) ===
No. overall	No. in season	Title	Directed by	Written by	Narrated by	Original release date	Prod. code
71	1	"Alistair's Time Machine"	Ed Wiseman	Patty Marx	Arnold Stang	September 16, 1991	706
Feature Book: Alistair's Time Machine Review Books: The Many Lives of Benjamin Franklin; What Does It Do?: A Book About Inventions; Find Waldo Now
72	2	"The Adventures of Taxi Dog"	Mark Mannucci	Jill Gluckson	Vincent Gardenia	September 17, 1991	707
Feature Book: The Adventures of Taxi Dog by Debra and Sal Barracca, pictures by Mark Buehner Review Books: Taxi: A Book of City Words by Betsy and Giulio Maestro; I Want a Dog by Dayal Kaur Khalsa; The First Dog by Jan Brett
73	3	"The Legend of the Indian Paintbrush"	Larry Lancit	Kristin Laskas Martin	Harold Littlebird	September 18, 1991	708
Feature Book: The Legend of the Indian Paintbrush retold and illustrated by Tomie de Paola Review Books: Rainbow Crow retold by Nancy Van Laan, illustrated by Beatriz Vidal; Indians of the Americas from the New True Book series; The Mud Pony retold by Caron Lee Cohen, illustrated by Shonto Begay
74	4	"Galimoto"	Mark Mannucci	Ronnie Krauss	Hattie Winston	September 19, 1991	709
Feature Book: Galimoto Review Books: Look at This; The Little Pigs' Puppet Book; My First Activity Book
75	5	"Fox on the Job"	Ed Wiseman	Robert Stork	Fred Newman	September 20, 1991	710
Feature Book: Fox on the Job by James Marshall Review Books: Pig Pig Gets a Job by David McPhail; Helping Out by George Ancona; Music, Music for Everyone by Vera B. Williams
76	6	"Opt: An Illusionary Tale"	Mark Mannucci	Ronnie Krauss	LeVar Burton	September 23, 1991	801
Feature Book: Opt: An Illusionary Tale Review Books: Hide and Seek; If At First You Do Not See; Lenses!: Take a Closer Look
77	7	"Raccoons and Ripe Corn"	Larry Lancit	Andrew Gutelle	Julia Barr	September 24, 1991	802
Feature Book: Raccoons and Ripe Corn Review Books: Tree Trunk Traffic; My First Nature Book; Bird Watch
78	8	"The Lady with the Ship on Her Head"	Ed Wiseman	Ellis Weiner	Marilyn Pasekoff	September 25, 1991	803
Feature Book: The Lady with the Ship on Her Head Review Books: Moog-Moog, Space Barber; An Enchanted Hair Tale; The Flyaway Pantaloons
79	9	"Kate Shelley and the Midnight Express"	Richard Hendrick	Jill Gluckson	Brian Dennehy	September 26, 1991	804
Feature Book: Kate Shelley and the Midnight Express Review Books: The Train to Lulu's; The Little Engine that Could; The Polar Express
80	10	"Snowy Day: Stories and Poems"	Ed Wiseman	Ronnie Krauss	Lena Horne (Winter Morning), Lacey Chabert (Snow), and Richard Courtney (Stopping By Woods on a Snowy Evening)	September 27, 1991	805
Feature Book: Snowy Day: Stories and Poems edited by Caroline Feller Bauer, illustrated by Margot Tomes Review Books: Over the River and Through the Wood by Lydia Maria Child, illustrated by Iris Van Rynbach; Winter by Ron Hirschi, photographs by Thomas D. Mangelsen; Stopping by Woods on a Snowy Evening by Robert Frost, illustrated by Susan Jeffers NOTE: In this episode, all the story segments are presented in live action instead of semi-animated illustrations.

=== Season 10 (1992) ===
No. overall	No. in season	Title	Directed by	Written by	Narrated by	Original release date	Prod. code
81	1	"Tar Beach"	Mark Mannucci	Jill Gluckson	Ruby Dee	October 5, 1992	806
Feature Book: Tar Beach by Faith Ringgold Review Books: I'm Flying! by Alan Wade, pictures by Petra Mathers; On Grandma's Roof by Erica Silverman, illustrated by Deborah Kogan Ray; To Sleep by James Sage, illustrated by Warwick Hutton
82	2	"The Wall"	Mark Mannucci	Andrew Gutelle	Jason Ruggiero	October 6, 1992	807
Feature Book: The Wall Review Books: Tillie and the Wall; My Grandson Lew; All Those Secrets of the World
83	3	"Sam the Sea Cow"	Ed Wiseman	Andrew Gutelle	Jason Robards	October 7, 1992	808
Feature Book: Sam the Sea Cow Review Books: Manatees; "10 Things I Know" Books; Will We Miss Them?: Endangered Species
84	4	"Rechenka's Eggs"	Mark Mannucci	Ronnie Krauss	Viveca Lindfors	October 8, 1992	809
Feature Book: Rechenka's Eggs Review Books: The Talking Eggs; I Made It Myself; Stefan and Olga
85	5	"Sophie and Lou"	Fred Surr	Fred Surr	Jessica Walter	October 9, 1992	810
Feature Book: Sophie and Lou Review Books: Cordelia, Dance!; Lion Dancer: Ernie Wan's Chinese New Year; Dancing with the Indians
86	6	"Come a Tide"	Ed Wiseman	Susan Leeds	Dixie Carter	October 12, 1992	901
Feature Book: Come a Tide Review Books: Tornado Alert; Weather; Storms
87	7	"The Piggy in the Puddle"	Ed Wiseman	Orly Berger & Ed Wiseman	Tovah Feldshuh	October 13, 1992	902
Feature Book: The Piggy in the Puddle Review Books: This House is Made of Mud; The Hippopotamus Song: A Muddy Love Story; Oink
88	8	"Seashore Surprises"	Mark Mannucci	Ronnie Krauss	LeVar Burton	October 14, 1992	903
Feature Book: Seashore Surprises Review Books: The Seashore Book; What's Inside? Shells; Is This a House for Hermit Crab?
89	9	"Through Moon and Stars and Night Skies"	Mark Mannucci	Ronnie Krauss	Andrew Lei	October 15, 1992	904
Feature Book: Through Moon and Stars and Night Skies Review Books: Horace; Fathers, Mothers, Sisters, Brothers: A Collection of Family Poems; Free to Be...a Family
90	10	"Berlioz the Bear"	Mark Mannucci	Jill Gluckson	James Avery	October 16, 1992	905
Feature Book: Berlioz the Bear Review Books: The Science Book of Sound; Georgia Music; Introduction to Musical Instruments series: Brass/Strings/Woodwinds/Percussion

=== Season 11 (1993) ===
No. overall	No. in season	Title	Directed by	Written by	Narrated by	Original release date	Prod. code
91	1	"Amazing Grace"	Ed Wiseman	Andrew Gutelle	Tyne Daly	October 11, 1993	906
Feature Book: Amazing Grace LeVar visits a theater to discuss acting and how pretending to be someone else helps people express their feelings. He also visits his friend, Whoopi Goldberg, who was launching her own talk show, and discussed how her unique look has affected her career as an actor and comedian. Review Books: Mirette on the High Wire; Great Women in the Struggle; Roses Sing on New Snow
92	2	"The Furry News: How to Make a Newspaper"	Ed Wiseman	Andrew Gutelle	the cast of Forbidden Broadway (Susanne Blakeslee, Dorothy Kiara, Brad Oscar, Craig Wells) and Lee Murphy	October 12, 1993	907
Feature Book: The Furry News: How to Make a Newspaper LeVar meets comic strip artist Ray Billingsley, the creator of Curtis. Review Books: What It's Like to Be a...Newspaper Reporter; Great Newspaper Crafts; Newspapers
93	3	"Mrs. Katz and Tush"	Mark Mannucci	Ronnie Krauss	Reizl Bozyk and Rick English	October 13, 1993	908
Feature Book: Mrs. Katz and Tush Review Books: Wilfrid Gordon McDonald Partridge; Abuela; Kwanzaa
94	4	"The Salamander Room"	Mark Mannucci	Ronnie Krauss	Lynne Thigpen	October 14, 1993	909
Feature Book: The Salamander Room by Anne Mazer, illustrated by Steve Johnson and Lou Fancher Review Books: The Great Kapok Tree by Lynne Cherry; Chipmunk Song by Joanne Ryder, pictures by Lynne Cherry; Frogs, Toads, Lizards and Salamanders by Nancy Winslow Parker and Joan Richards Wright, illustrations by Nancy Winslow Parker
95	5	"Silent Lotus"	Mark Mannucci	Ronnie Krauss	Lea Salonga	October 15, 1993	910
Feature Book: Silent Lotus Review Books: The Handmade Alphabet; Hand Rhymes; Amy: The Story of a Deaf Child
96	6	"Follow the Drinking Gourd"	Mark Mannucci	Steve Conner & Charlie Rice	Keith David	October 18, 1993	1001
Feature Book: Follow the Drinking Gourd Review Books: Shake It to the One that You Love the Best; Sweet Clara and the Freedom Quilt; A Picture Book of Harriet Tubman
97	7	"If You Give a Mouse a Cookie"	Ed Wiseman	Andrew Gutelle	Beth Howland	October 19, 1993	1002
Feature Book: If You Give a Mouse a Cookie by Laura Joffe Numeroff, illustrated by Felicia Bond Review Books: This is the Key to the Kingdom by Diane Worfolk Allison; The House that Jack Built, pictures by Jenny Stow; Smart Dog by Ralph Leemis, illustrated by Chris Demarest
98	8	"Is This a House for Hermit Crab?"	Mark Mannucci	Ronnie Krauss	Eartha Kitt	October 20, 1993	1003
Feature Book: Is This a House for Hermit Crab? by Megan McDonald, illustrated by S.D. Schindler Review Books: Urban Roosts by Barbara Bash; Spider's Web by Christine Back and Barrie Watts; Busy, Busy Squirrels by Colleen Stanley Bare
99	9	"And Still the Turtle Watched"	Mark Mannucci	Jill Gluckson	Michael Ansara	October 21, 1993	1004
Feature Book: And Still the Turtle Watched by Sheila MacGill-Callahan, pictures by Barry Moser Review Books: Thirteen Moons on Turtle's Back by Joseph Bruchac and Jonathan London, illustrated by Thomas Locker; My First Green Book by Angela Wilkes; A River Ran Wild by Lynne Cherry
100	10	"June 29, 1999"	Ed Wiseman	Andrew Gutelle	Charles Kimbrough	October 22, 1993	1005
Feature Book: June 29, 1999 by David Wiesner Review Books: Time Train by Paul Fleischman, illustrations by Claire Ewart; Growing Vegetable Soup by Lois Ehlert; Cloudy with a Chance of Meatballs by Judi Barrett, drawn by Ron Barrett

=== Season 12 (1994) ===
No. overall	No. in season	Title	Directed by	Written by	Narrated by	Original release date	Prod. code
101	1	"Nosey Mrs. Rat"	Ed Wiseman	Andrew Gutelle & Ronnie Krauss	Faith Prince	October 3, 1994	1006
Feature Book: Nosey Mrs. Rat LeVar meets primatologist Jane Goodall, who explains how her own curiosity helped her become a leading scientist. Review Books: The 13th Clue; Tiger; Mouse Views: What the Class Pet Saw
102	2	"Borreguita and the Coyote"	Mark Mannucci	Bernardo Solano	Olga Merediz	October 4, 1994	1007
Feature Book: Borreguita and the Coyote Review Books: Diego; The Three Little Javelinas; Coyote Dreams
103	3	"Summer"	Mark Mannucci & Ed Wiseman	Andrew Gutelle	Ossie Davis	October 5, 1994	1008
Feature Book: Summer Review Books: Nature All Year Long; Turtle in July; Changes
104	4	"Once There Was a Tree"	James C. Wright	Ronnie Krauss	Eli Wallach	October 6, 1994	1009
Feature Book: Once There Was a Tree Review Books: The Tremendous Tree Book; Red Leaf, Yellow Leaf; The Tree in the Wood
105	5	"Appelemando's Dreams"	Ed Wiseman	Ronnie Krauss	Michael Learned	October 7, 1994	1010
Feature Book: Appelemando's Dreams Review Books: The Little Painter of Sabana Grande; The Incredible Painting of Felix Clousseau; I Am an Artist
106	6	"The Lotus Seed"	Mark Mannucci	Susan Kim	Rona Figueroa	October 10, 1994	1101
Feature Book: The Lotus Seed Review Books: I'm New Here; Grandfather's Journey; Halmoni and the Picnic
107	7	"Hail to Mail"	Mark Mannucci	Andrew Gutelle	Al Roker	October 11, 1994	1102
Feature Book: Hail to Mail Review Books: Messages in the Mailbox: How to Write a Letter; Stringbean's Trip to the Shining Sea; The Jolly Postman or Other People's Letters
108	8	"Stellaluna"	Mark Mannucci	Ronnie Krauss	Anne Jackson	October 12, 1994	1103
Feature Book: Stellaluna Review Books: Amazing Bats; Step into the Night; Sleep is for Everyone
109	9	"My Shadow"	Mark Mannucci	Susan Kim	Robert Guillaume	October 13, 1994	1104
Feature Book: My Shadow Review Books: Shadows and Reflections; I Have a Friend; Shadowgraphs
110	10	"Ruth Law Thrills a Nation"	Mark Mannucci	Susan Kim	Linda Lavin	October 14, 1994	1105
Feature Book: Ruth Law Thrills a Nation Review Books: Plane Song; Flight; Amelia's Fantastic Flight

=== Season 13 (1995) ===
No. overall	No. in season	Title	Directed by	Written by	Narrated by	Original release date	Prod. code
111	1	"The Wonderful Towers of Watts"	Mark Mannucci	Susan Kim & Ronnie Krauss	Angela Bassett	October 2, 1995	1106
Feature Book: The Wonderful Towers of Watts Review Books: I Got Community; Night on Neighborhood Street; The Car Washing Street
112	2	"Martha Speaks"	Mark Mannucci	Mark Eisman & Ronnie Krauss	Jo Hayden	October 3, 1995	1107
Feature Book: Martha Speaks by Susan Meddaugh Review Books: Earth Hounds; The Night I Followed the Dog; My Puppy is Born
113	3	"Alejandro's Gift"	Larry Lancit	Andrew Gutelle	Francisco Rivela	October 4, 1995	1108
Feature Book: Alejandro's Gift Review Books: Water, Water Everywhere; It Rained on the Desert Today; The Desert Alphabet Book
114	4	"The Sign Painter's Dream"	Ed Wiseman	Lee Hunkins & Jill Gluckson	Jamie Farr	October 5, 1995	1109
Feature Book: The Sign Painter's Dream Review Books: The Signmaker's Assistant; I Read Signs; The Letter Jesters
115	5	"Archibald Frisby"	Mark Mannucci	Jill Gluckson	Arnold Stang	October 6, 1995	1110
Feature Book: Archibald Frisby Review Books: What Makes Popcorn Pop?; Wonder Why Soap Makes Bubbles?; Science Magic series: Sound/Light/Air/Water

=== Season 14 (1996) ===
No. overall	No. in season	Title	Directed by	Written by	Narrated by	Original release date	Prod. code
116	1	"Fly Away Home"	Mark Mannucci	Ronnie Krauss	Daniel Saltzman	April 8, 1996	1111
Feature Book: Fly Away Home Review Books: The Homeless Hibernating Bear; Uncle Willie and the Soup Kitchen; Home
117	2	"Uncle Jed's Barbershop"	Mark Mannucci	Lee Hunkins	Regina Taylor	April 9, 1996	1112
Feature Book: Uncle Jed's Barbershop Review Books: Zora Hurston and the Chinaberry Tree; Alvin Ailey; A Peddler's Dream
118	3	"How to Make an Apple Pie and See the World"	Larry Lancit & Kevin Lombard	Andrew Gutelle	Helen Mirren	April 10, 1996	1113
Feature Book: How to Make an Apple Pie and See the World Review Books: The Edible Pyramid; The Kids Around the World Cookbook; What Food is This?
119	4	"Owen"	Ed Wiseman	McPaul Smith	Matthew Broderick	April 11, 1996	1114
Feature Book: Owen Review Books: Ira Sleeps Over; Darcy and Gran Don't Like Babies; Born in the Gravy
120	5	"How Much is a Million?"	Ed Wiseman, Tony Jacobs & Barry Shapiro	Jill Gluckson	Nick Sullivan	April 12, 1996	1115
Feature Book: How Much is a Million? Review Books: Only One; One Hundred Hungry Ants; How Many Stars in the Sky?

=== Season 15 (1996) ===
No. overall	No. in season	Title	Directed by	Written by	Narrated by	Original release date	Prod. code
121	1	"Always My Dad"	Ed Wiseman	Lee Hunkins	BJ Crosby	October 7, 1996	1201
Feature Book: Always My Dad Review Books: Boundless Grace; The Perfect Spot; Taxi! Taxi!
122	2	"Bread is for Eating"	Kevin Lombard, Ed Wiseman, & Tony Jacobs	Ronnie Krauss & Sharon Dennis Wyeth	Cecilia Arana and Michael Uribe	October 8, 1996	1202
Feature Book: Bread is for Eating Review Books: Bread, Bread, Bread; The Tortilla Factory; Walter the Baker
123	3	"Hotel Animal"	Ed Wiseman	Ronnie Krauss	John Cunningham	October 9, 1996	1203
Feature Book: Hotel Animal Review Books: The Three Bears; Mr. Tall and Mr. Small; Zoom
124	4	"Someplace Else"	Kevin Lombard	Robert Stork	Carol Kane	October 10, 1996	1204
Feature Book: Someplace Else Review Books: Me on the Map; Town Mouse, Country Mouse; Somewhere in the World Right Now
125	5	"Zin! Zin! Zin! a Violin"	Mark Mannucci	Ronnie Krauss	Gregory Hines	October 11, 1996	1205
Feature Book: Zin! Zin! Zin! a Violin Review Books: The Maestro Plays; Max Found Two Sticks; Meet the Orchestra

=== Season 16 (1997) ===
No. overall	No. in season	Title	Directed by	Written by	Narrated by	Original release date	Prod. code
126	1	"On the Day You Were Born"	Ed Wiseman	Billy Aronson	Patrick Stewart	April 7, 1997	1206
Feature Book: On the Day You Were Born Review Books: How You Were Born; One Round Moon and a Star for Me; A Teeny Tiny Baby
127	2	"Hip Cat"	Mark Mannucci	McPaul Smith	Ann Duquesnay	April 8, 1997	1207
Feature Book: Hip Cat Review Books: Conga Crocodile; Charlie Parker Played Be Bop; Willie Jerome
128	3	"Regina's Big Mistake"	Ed Wiseman	Ronnie Krauss & Renee Creange	Anna Holbrooks	April 9, 1997	1208
Feature Book: Regina's Big Mistake Review Books: The Little Painter of Sabana Grande; The Art Lesson; I Am an Artist
129	4	"Giving Thanks: A Native American Good Morning Message"	Kevin Lombard	Ronnie Krauss & Ellen Doherty	Nicholson Earl Billey	April 10, 1997	1209
Feature Book: Giving Thanks: A Native American Good Morning Message Review Books: My First Green Book; A River Ran Wild; The Tremendous Tree Book
130	5	"The Carousel"	Ed Wiseman	Jill Gluckson	Sarah Hubbard	April 11, 1997	1210
Feature Book: The Carousel Review Books: The Long Silk Strand; The Always Prayer Shawl; Up and Down on the Merry-Go-Round

=== Season 17 (1998) ===
No. overall	No. in season	Title	Directed by	Written by	Narrated by	Original release date	Prod. code
131	1	"Math Curse"	Ed Wiseman	Ronnie Krauss	Michelle Trachtenberg	October 5, 1998	1301
Feature Book: Math Curse Review Books: Pigs on a Blanket; Twelve Snails to One Lizard; Marvelous Math
132	2	"My Life with the Wave"	Larry Lancit	Cecily Truett	Scott Irby-Ranniar	October 6, 1998	1302
Feature Book: My Life with the Wave Review Books: Water Dance; Our Wet World; Here is the Coral Reef
133	3	"Saturday Sancocho"	Ed Wiseman	Ronnie Krauss	Jose de Guzman	October 7, 1998	1303
Feature Book: Saturday Sancocho Review Books: Mama Bear; The Pirate Cookbook; Mama Provi and the Pot of Rice
134	4	"When Aunt Lena Did the Rhumba"	Mark Mannucci	Jill Gluckson	Lucie Arnaz	October 8, 1998	1304
Feature Book: When Aunt Lena Did the Rhumba Review Books: My Mama Had a Dancing Heart; The Dancing Man; The Old Man Who Loved to Sing
135	5	"Worksong"	Ed Wiseman	Ronnie Krauss	David Canary	October 9, 1998	1305
Feature Book: Worksong Review Books: Work; I'm Going to Be a Firefighter and I'm Going to Be a Police Officer; A Day's Work

=== Season 18 (2000–01) ===
No. overall	No. in season	Title	Directed by	Written by	Narrated by	Original release date	Prod. code
136	1	"The Shaman's Apprentice: A Tale of the Amazon Rain Forest"	Kevin Lombard	Ronnie Krauss	Susan Sarandon	May 8, 2000	1401
Feature Book: The Shaman's Apprentice: A Tale of the Amazon Rain Forest Review Books: Amazon Diary; People in the Rainforest; Welcome to the Greenhouse
137	2	"Pet Stories You Don't Have to Walk"	Larry Lancit	Cecily Truett	Jason Alexander	November 20, 2000	1402
"Danny and the Dinosaur"; "A Dog's Tale"; Review Books: Harry and Lulu; Aloha, Dolores; Moondogs
138	3	"Lemonade for Sale"	Ed Wiseman	Robert Stork	Andrea McArdle	January 19, 2001	1403
Feature Book: Lemonade for Sale Review Books: Lulu's Lemonade; Neale S. Godfrey's Ultimate Kids' Money Book; How the Second Grade Got $8,205.50 to Visit the Statue of Liberty
139	4	"The Secret Shortcut"	Ed Wiseman	Susan Kim	Tim Conway	February 16, 2001	1404
Feature Book: The Secret Shortcut Review Books: Mapping Penny's World; Pipsqueaks! Maze School; How Tall, How Short, How Faraway
140	5	"My America: A Poetry Atlas of the United States"	Ed Wiseman	Susan Kim	Lea Salonga (Mauna Loa), Tom and Ray Magliozzi (New England Lighthouse), and Nikki Giovanni (Knoxville, Tennessee)	March 16, 2001	1405
Feature Book: My America: A Poetry Atlas of the United States Review Books: The Scrambled States of America; Tulip Sees America; Celebrate the 50 States!
141	6	"Badger's Parting Gifts"	Ed Wiseman	Jill Gluckson	Ruby Dee	April 20, 2001	1406
Feature Book: Badger's Parting Gifts Review Books: The Grandad Tree; The Tenth Good Thing About Barney; A Gift for Abuelita: Celebrating the Day of the Dead

=== Season 19 (2002) ===
All episodes this season were directed by Ed Wiseman.

No. overall	No. in season	Title	Written by	Narrated by	Original release date	Prod. code
142	1	"The Tin Forest"	Ronnie Krauss	Jeff Bridges	September 3, 2002	1407
Feature Book: The Tin Forest Review Books: On That Day; Mole Music; The Wonderful Happens
143	2	"Max"	Susan Kim	Regina King and Ian Desdone	September 4, 2002	1408
Feature Book: Max Review Books: The Mitten Tree; If a Bus Could Talk: The Story of Rosa Parks; Sosu's Call
144	3	"Enemy Pie"	Ronnie Krauss	Ed Harris	September 5, 2002	1409
Feature Book: Enemy Pie Review Books: Don't Laugh at Me; The Brand New Kid; Hey, Little Ant
145	4	"Our Big Home: An Earth Poem"	Susan Kim	Naomi Judd	September 6, 2002	1410
Feature Book: Our Big Home: An Earth Poem Review Books: Take Action: A Guide to Active Citizenship; Whoever You Are

=== Season 20 (2004–05) ===
All episodes this season were directed by Ed Wiseman.

No. overall	No. in season	Title	Written by	Narrated by	Original release date	Prod. code
146	1	"Visiting Day"	Ronnie Krauss	Alfre Woodard	December 15, 2004	1501
Feature Book: Visiting Day Review Books: Finding the Right Spot; Let's Talk About When Your Parent is in Jail; Mama Loves Me from Away
147	2	"Unique Monique"	Jill Gluckson	Eliza Dushku	December 16, 2004	1502
Feature Book: Unique Monique Review Books: Daffodil; I'm Gonna Like Me; The Name Jar
148	3	"Mr. George Baker"	Ronnie Krauss	Wayne Brady	December 17, 2004	1503
Feature Book: Mr. George Baker Review Books: The Music in Derrick's Heart; Grandfather Counts; A Bird About to Sing
149	4	"Beegu"	Twila Liggett	Freddie Prinze Jr.	January 20, 2005	1504
Feature Book: Beegu Review Books: Space Exploration; Planets: A Solar System Stickerbook; Rise the Moon
150	5	"Two Old Potatoes and Me"	Ronnie Krauss	Jordan Puryear	January 21, 2005	1505
Feature Book: Two Old Potatoes and Me Review Books: Weslandia; Diary of a Worm; Pie in the Sky

=== Season 21 (2006) ===
No. overall	No. in season	Title	Directed by	Written by	Narrated by	Original release date	Prod. code
151	1	"The Biggest Test in the Universe"	Ed Wiseman	Ronnie Krauss	Richard Gere	November 6, 2006	1601
Feature Book: The Biggest Test in the Universe Review Books: Angelina on Stage; Beverly Billingsly Takes a Bow; Wemberly Worried
152	2	"I Lost My Tooth in Africa"	Mark Mannucci	Ronnie Krauss	TBA	November 7, 2006	1602
Feature Book: I Lost My Tooth in Africa Review Books: Madlenka; Rites of Passage: Coming of Age; My Wobbly Tooth Must Not Ever Never Fall Out
153	3	"Boxes for Katje"	Ed Wiseman	Ronnie Krauss	Elizabeth Jute	November 8, 2006	1603
Feature Book: Boxes for Katje Review Books: Luba: As Told to Michelle R. McCann; Librarian of Basra; The Lady in the Box
154	4	"Game Day"	Ed Wiseman	Ed Wiseman	James Avery	November 9, 2006	1604
Feature Book: Game Day Review Books: The Blue Ribbon Day; Pecorino Plays Ball; Winners Never Quit
155	5	"Show Way"	Ed Wiseman	Ronnie Krauss	Diahann Carroll	November 10, 2006	1605
Feature Book: Show Way Review Books: The Kids' Family Tree Book; What a Family!; Seven Brave Women

=== Season 22 (2025) ===
No. overall	No. in season	Title	Directed by	Written by	Narrated by	Original release date	Prod. code
156	1	"No Cats in the Library!"	Unknown	Unknown	Jamie Chung	October 4, 2025	1701
Feature Book: No Cats in the Library! Review: No. 5 Bubblegum Street; Rescuing Rumba; Jonty Gentoo: The Adventures of a Penguin
157	2	"Tiny Troubles: Nelli's Purpose"	Unknown	Unknown	Chrissy Teigen and John Legend	October 11, 2025	1702
Feature Book: Tiny Troubles: Nelli's Purpose Review: Soar; Together, United; I Want to Dance in Pants
158	3	"More Than Peach"	Unknown	Unknown	Gabrielle Union	October 18, 2025	1703
Feature Book: More Than Peach Review: I Am Odd, I Am Enough; Ballet Brown; You Are Enough: A Story About Inclusion
159	4	"Moo Hoo"	Unknown	Unknown	Adam DeVine	October 25, 2025	1704
Feature Book: Moo Hoo Review: Jocelyn's Box of Socks; Max's Box: Letting Go of Big Feelings; My Big Embarrassing Elephant

== VHS releases distributed by PBS and Pacific Arts ==
Title	Release date	Notes
Volume 1	August 13, 1992	"Rumpelstiltskin", and "Snowy Day: Stories and Poems"
Volume 2	August 13, 1992	"Dive to the Coral Reef", and "The Magic School Bus: Inside the Earth"
Volume 3	August 13, 1992	"Mummies Made in Egypt", and "Bringing the Rain to Kapiti Plain"
Volume 4	August 13, 1992	"The Legend of the Indian Paintbrush", and "The Life Cycle of the Honeybee"
Volume 5	August 13, 1992	"The Bicycle Man", and "The Adventures Of Taxi Dog"
Volume 6	August 13, 1992	"Opt: An Illusionary Tale", and "A Three Hat Day"

== DVD releases ==
DVD name	# of episodes	Release date	No. of discs
Reading Rainbow Favorites	8	July 18, 2006	4
Reading Rainbow: Family Matters	2	July 18, 2006	1
Reading Rainbow: Man's Best Friend	2	July 18, 2006	1
Reading Rainbow: Ocean Life	2	July 18, 2006	1
Reading Rainbow: Music, Music Everywhere	2	July 18, 2006	1
Reading Rainbow: Let's Go!	2	September 12, 2006	1
Reading Rainbow: How's That Made?	2	September 12, 2006	1
Reading Rainbow: Birds of a Feather	2	September 12, 2006	1
Reading Rainbow: Desert Life	2	September 12, 2006	1
Reading Rainbow: Sea To Shining Sea – Stories of America	2	November 7, 2006	1
Reading Rainbow: Farm Life	2	November 7, 2006	1
Reading Rainbow: Math Is Everywhere	2	November 7, 2006	1
Reading Rainbow: Buried Treasures	2	November 7, 2006	1
Reading Rainbow: If You Give a Mouse a Cookie	4	May 12, 2015	1
Reading Rainbow: Animal Cafe	4	June 30, 2015	1
Reading Rainbow: Miss Nelson Is Back	4	January 12, 2016	1
Reading Rainbow: LeVar's Favorites	5	May 10, 2016	1
