= Lamplighter (disambiguation) =

A lamplighter was an employee of a town who lit street lights.

Lamplighter may also refer to:

== Arts ==
- Lamplighters Music Theatre, a San Francisco-based light opera company
- The Lamplighter, a 2007 radio play by Jackie Kay

=== Literature ===
- The Lamplighter, an 1854 novel by Maria Susanna Cummins
- "The Lamplighter" (poem), a poem by Robert Louis Stevenson
- Monster Blood Tattoo: Lamplighter, a 2006 novel by D. M. Cornish
- The Lamplighter, a 1929 collection of poems by Irish poet Seumas O'Sullivan
- "Lamplighter", a 1987 children's story by Bernice Thurman Hunter
- Lamplighter, a Green Lantern enemy in DC comics
- Lamplighter, a supporting character in The Boys
- Lamplighters, a group of characters in John Le Carré's novel Tinker Tailor Soldier Spy (1974)

== People with the surname ==
- L. Jagi Lamplighter, an American fantasy writer

== Other uses ==
- Lamplighter (horse)
- Tall bike, an unusually tall bicycle, also known as a lamplighter

== See also ==
- Lamplighters Yeshivah, a Jewish Montessori-style school in Brooklyn, US
- Lamplighter group, a mathematical object
- "The Old Lamp-Lighter", a song by The Browns
