= My Shadow =

My Shadow may refer to:

- "My Shadow" (poem), poem by Robert Louis Stevenson
- "My Shadow", song by Keane from Night Train
- "My Shadow" (song), song by Jessie J
- "My Shadow", song by The Sound of Arrows from Voyage
- "My Shadow", song by Jay Reatard from Blood Visions
- Mera Saaya (lit. 'My Shadow'), a 1966 Indian Hindi-language film
