= Feelings (Aliki book) =

Book by Aliki Brandenberg

- First edition
- Author: Aliki Brandenberg
- Illustrator: Brandenberg
- Language: English
- Genre: Children's literature, picture book, Emotions
- Published: 1984 (Mulberry Books)
- Publication place: United States
- Media type: Print (hardback, paperback)
- Pages: 32 (some editions unpaginated)
- ISBN: 9780688065188
- OCLC: 732819755

Feelings is a children's picture book by Aliki Brandenberg published in 1984. It is also featured in a Reading Rainbow episode in 1986.

== About ==
This picture book is written and illustrated by Aliki Brandenberg. The book depicts children feeling various emotions. Each page has several small pictures, sometimes as many as twenty a page, to describe the emotions visually. Some illustrations are captioned. Two birds comment on the feelings depicted on each page.

=== Reading Rainbow ===
Feelings was featured on an episode of Reading Rainbow that first aired on June 25, 1986.

== Reviews ==
School Library Journal wrote that the number of illustrations on the page made reading the book confusing. In addition, girls were often chosen to represent negative emotions, such as envy and jealousy, while boys are used to illustrate "brave and courageous." The Bulletin of the Center for Children's Books felt that the illustrations were too small and used inconsistently throughout the book. The Santa Cruz Sentinel felt that the book "will delight children because it validates their feelings."

== Editions and revisions ==
Some editions of the book contain extra spreads of wordless panels on colored pages at the beginning and end of the book (not directly against the covers). Each page is a 16-panel story like the ice cream one on the front cover. In order, these stories are of a reluctant water slide rider, a girl taking care of birds outside, a broken and mended vase, and recovery from a bad dream. These are in some Mulberry and Scholastic editions. A Scholastic edition also contains a story on the back cover: two friends writing and receiving a letter.

Mulberry editions (1986) have a "Reading Rainbow Book" logo in the bottom right corner of the cover and Scholastic editions (1991) have the usual Scholastic imprint on the bottom left. Scholastic editions may be stapled with no spine lettering and may also leave out page numbers.

A 2019 edition is nearly identical to the original book, with the major change being a note from the author added inside the front cover. The cover art drops the old all-caps serifed title and author lettering, using a bubbly font twice the height for the title and adding "by" before the author's name (in a bold sans-serif too); it uses bolder colors for the artwork and moves the panels closer together, and adds the last panel of page 31 around the author's name. One panel on page 31 has been altered from the original, however: when the boy puffs out his chest and poses, the girl originally guesses he's illustrating "fat" (all caps, no punctuation, like "angry" and "sad" above it); in the revision, she guesses "Strong?" instead.
