= Let's-Read-and-Find-Out Science =

Children's book series

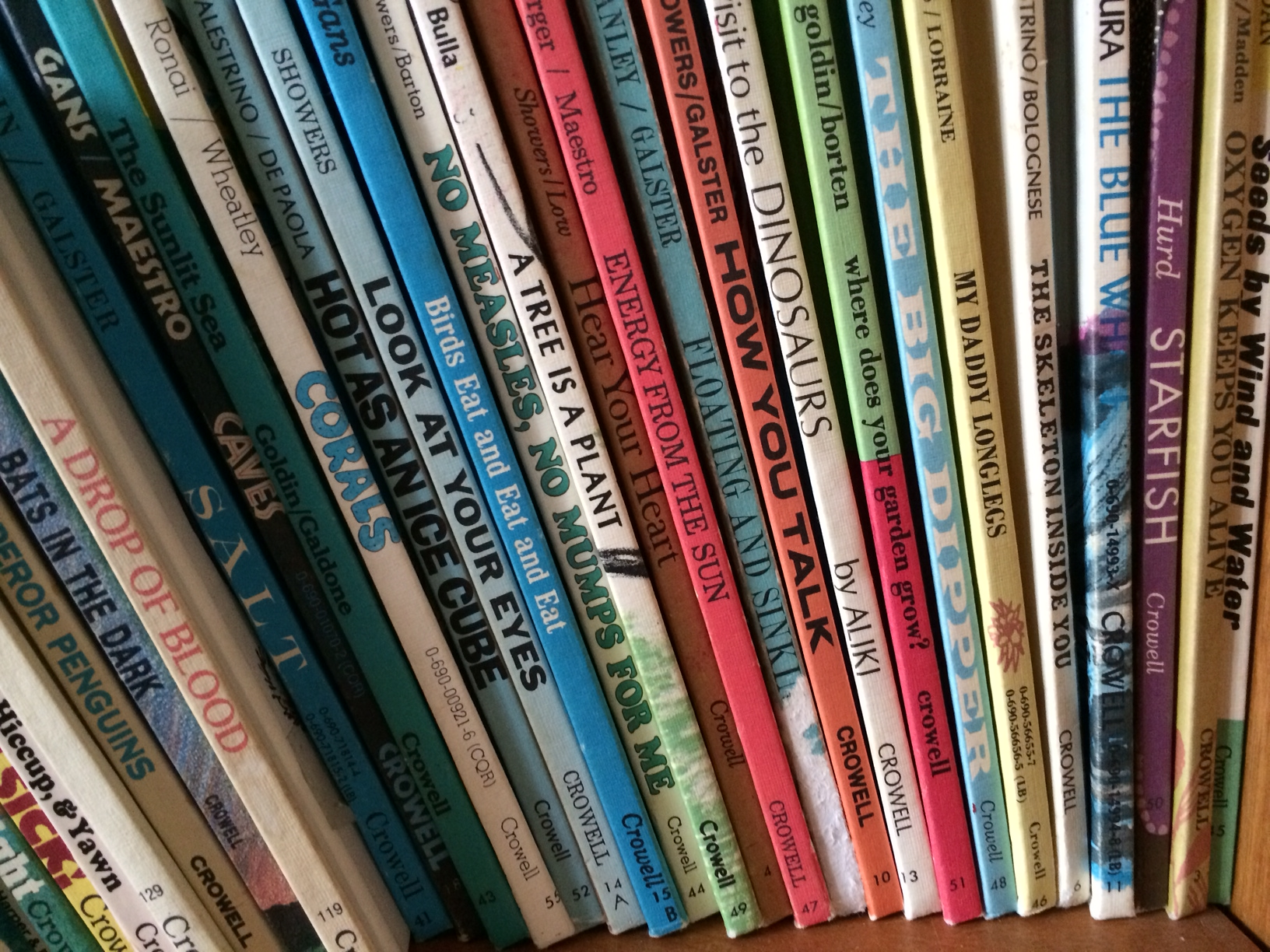
Let's-Read-and-Find-Out Science

The Let's-Read-and-Find-Out Science Books series, originally published by Crowell, now HarperCollins, is an American children's book series designed to educate preschoolers and young elementary school students about basic science concepts.

Many Let's Read and Find Out titles have either been reillustrated (sometimes more than once) or reissued under different titles. Some of these titles may be duplicates because of the renaming.

Since the 1990s, the series has been divided into two levels. Stage 1 books "explain simple and easily observable science concepts for preschool- and kindergarten-age children." Subjects covered in Stage 1 titles include the human body, plants, animals and "the world around us."

Stage 2 books "explore more challenging concepts for children in the primary grades and include hands-on activities that children can do themselves." Subjects covered in the Stage 2 titles including the human body, plants, animals, dinosaurs, space, weather and the seasons, our earth and "the world around us."

== Let's Read and Find Out Science book list ==
Title	Author	Illustrator(s)	Year Pubd.	Summary	Topic	Stage
Baby Starts to Grow, A	Paul Showers	Rosalind Fry	1969			
Drop of Blood, A	Paul Showers	Robert Galster	1967 1989		Human body	Stage 2
"Sid The Science Kid: A Cavity Is A Hole In Your Tooth"	Jodi Huelin	2010				
Jellyfish Is Not a Fish, A	John E. Waters	Kazue Mizumura	1979			
Map Is a Picture, A	Barbara Rinkoff	Robert Galster	1965			
A Nest Full of Eggs	Priscilla Belz Jenkins	Lizzy Rockwell	1995		Plants and animals	Stage 1
A Tree Is a Plant	Clyde Bulla	Lois Lignell	1960 2001		Plants and animals	Stage 1
Air Is All Around You	Franklyn Branley	Robert Galster	1962		The world around us	Stage 1
All Kinds of Feet	Ron and Nancy Goor		1984			
Almost Gone: The World's Rarest Animals	Steve Jenkins		2006			
An Octopus Is Amazing	Patricia Lauber	Holly Keller	1990			
Animals in Winter	Henrietta Bancroft and Richard Van Gelder	Gaetano di Palma	1963		Plants and Animals	Stage 1
Ant Cities	Arthur Dorros		1987		Plants and animals	Stage 2
Archaeologists Dig for Clues	Kate Duke		1996		Our Earth	
Baby Whales Drink Milk	Barbara Juster Esbensen	Lambert Davis	1994		Plants and animals	Stage 1
Bats in the Dark	John Kaufmann		1972			
Be a Friend to Trees	Patricia Lauber	Holly Keller	1994			
Bees and Beelines	Judy Hawes	Aliki	1972			
Before You Were a Baby	Paul Showers and Kay Showers	Ingrid Fetz	1968			
Big Tracks, Little Tracks	Millicent E. Selsam	Marlene Hill Donnelly	1998		Plants and Animals	Stage 1
Birds at Night	Roma Gans	Aliki	1968			
Birds Eat and Eat and Eat	Roma Gans	Ed Emberley	1963			
Birds Are Flying	John Kaufmann		1979			
Bird Talk	Roma Gans	Jo Polseno	1961			
Bits and Bytes: A Computer Dictionary for Beginners	Seymour Simon		1985			
Bugs Are Insects	Anne Rockwell	Steve Jenkins	2001		Plants and animals	Stage 1
Cactus in the Desert	Phyllis S. Busch	Harriet Barton	1979	Explains how cactus survive in the deserts where there is very little water.		
Camels: Ships of the Desert	John E. Waters	Reynold Ruffins	1974	Describes the physical characteristics of camels that enable them to withstand the heat of the desert for days at a time without water.	Plants and animals	
Caves	Roma Gans	Giulio Maestro	1976			
Chirping Crickets	Melvin Berger	Megan Lloyd	1998	Describes the physical characteristics, behavior, and life cycle of crickets while giving particular emphasis to how they chirp.	Plants and animals	Stage 2
Comets	Franklyn M. Branley	Giulio Maestro	1984		Outer space	Stage 2
Corals	Lili Ronai	Arabelle Wheatley	1976			
Clouds	Anne Rockwell	Frane Lessac	2008			Stage 1
Cockroaches: Here, There and Everywhere	Laurence P. Pringle	James and Ruth McCrea	1971			
Corn Is Maize: The Gift of the Indians	Aliki		1986		Plants and animals	Stage 2
Danger--Icebergs!	Roma Gans	Richard Rosenblum	1964 1987	Explains how icebergs are formed from glaciers, move into the ocean, create hazards to ships, and melt away.	Earth science	Stage 2
Day Light, Night Light: Where Light Comes From	Franklyn M. Branley	Stacey Schuett	1975	Discusses the properties of light, particularly its source in heat.		
Did Dinosaurs Have Feathers?	Kathleen Weidner Zoehfeld					
Digging Up Dinosaurs	Aliki				Dinosaurs	Stage 2
Dinosaur Babies	Kathleen Weidner Zoehfeld	Lucia Washburn	1999			
Dinosaur Bones	Aliki				Dinosaurs	Stage 2
Dinosaur Tracks	Kathleen Weidner Zoehfeld					
Dinosaurs Big and Small	Kathleen Weidner Zoehfeld					Stage 1
Dinosaurs Are Different	Aliki		1986		Dinosaurs	Stage 2
Dolphin Talk: Whistles, Clicks and Clapping Jaws	Wendy Pfeffer	Helen Davie	2003			
Down Come the Leaves	Henrietta Bancroft	Nonny Hogrogian	1961			
Down Comes the Rain	Franklyn M. Branley	James Graham Hale	1963, 1983	Rain, rainfall, clouds		
Ducks Don't Get Wet	Augusta Goldin	Leonard Kessler helen K. Davie	1965, 1999	Describes the behavior or different kinds of ducks and, in particular, discusses how all ducks use preening to keep their feathers dry.	Plants and animals	Stage 2
Ears Are for Hearing	Paul Showers	Holly Keller	1990		Human body	Stage 2
Earthquakes	Franklyn M. Branley	Richard Rosenblum	1990		Our Earth	Stage 2
Eclipse	Franklyn M. Branley	Donald Crews	1973 1988		Outer space	Stage 2
Elephant Families	Arthur Dorros		1994	Describes the unique qualities, status as an endangered species, and familial behavior of elephants.	Plants and animals	Stage 2
Energy from the Sun	Melvin Berger	Giulio Maestro	1976			
Energy Makes Things Happen	Kimberly Bradley	Paul Meisel	2002			
Evolution: The Story of How Life Developed on Earth	Joanna Cole	Aliki	1987		Earth science	Stage 2
Falcons Nest on Skyscrapers	Priscilla Belz Jenkins	Meagan Lloyd	1996			
Fat and Skinny	Philip Balestrino	Pam Makie	1975			
Feel the Wind	Arthur Dorros		1989		Weather and the seasons	Stage 2
Find Out by Touching	Paul Showers	Robert Galster	1961			
Fireflies in the Night	Judy Hawes	Kazue Mizumura, Ellen Alexander	1963 1991		Plants and animals	Stage 1
Flash, Crash, Rumble and Roll	Franklyn Branley	Ed Emberley, True Kelley	1964 1985		Weather and the seasons	Stage 2
Floating and Sinking	Franklyn M. Branley	Robert Galster	1967			
Floating in Space	Franklyn M. Branley	True Kelley	1998			Stage 2
Flying Giants of Long Ago	John Kaufmann		1984	An introduction to prehistoric insects, birds and reptiles that flew.		
Follow the Water from Brook to Ocean	Arthur Dorros		1993		Earth science	Stage 2
Follow Your Nose	Paul Showers	Paul Galdone	1963			Stage 2
Forces Make Things Move	Kimberly Bradley	Paul Meisel	2005	Simple language and humorous illustrations show how forces make things move, prevent them from starting to move, and stop them from moving		Stage 2
Fossils Tell of Long Ago	Aliki		1972 1990			
From Caterpillar to Butterfly	Deborah Heiligman	Bari Wrissman	1996		Plants and animals	Stage 1
From Seed to Pumpkin	Wendy Pfeffer	James Graham	2004		Plants and animals	Stage 1
From Tadpole to Frog	Wendy Pfeffer	Holly Keller	1994		Plants and animals	Stage 1
Germs Make Me Sick!	Melvin Berger	Marylin Hafner	1985		Human body	Stage 2
Get Ready for Robots	Patricia Lauber	True Kelley	1989			
Giraffes at Home	Ann Cooke	Robert Quackenbush	1972			
Glaciers	Wendell V. Tangborn	Marc Simont	1965 1988		Earth science	Stage 2
Gravity Is a Mystery	Franklyn M. Branley	Don Madden	1970 1986			
Green Grass and White Milk	Aliki		1974	Briefly describes how a cow produces milk, how milk is processed in a dairy, and how various other dairy products are made from milk. [Retitled Milk from Cow to Carton?]	Plants and animals	Stage 2
Green Turtle Mysteries	John F. Waters	Mamoru Funai	1972			
Hear Your Heart	Paul Showers	Joseph Low Holly Keller	1968 2001			
High Sounds, Low Sounds	Franklyn Branley	Paul Galdone	1967	Explains how every sound we hear is made by something that is moving, and how the vibrations are carried through the air to our ears and so produce sound.		
Honey In a Hive	Anne Rockwell	S.D. Schindler	2005	An introduction to the behavior and life cycle of honeybees, with particular emphasis on the production of honey.	Plants and animals	Stage 2
Hot As an Ice Cube	Philip Balestrino	Tomie dePaula	1971			
How a Seed Grows	Helene Jordan	Joseph Low, Loretta Krupinski	1960 1992		Plants and animals	Stage 1
How Animal Babies Stay Safe	Mary Ann Fraser		2001		Plants and Animals	Stage 1
How Do Apples Grow?	Betsy Maestro	Giulio Maestro	2000		Plants and animals	Stage 2
How Do Birds Find Their Way?	Roma Gans	Paul Mirocha	1996			
How Many Teeth?	Paul Showers	True Kelley	1962 1991		Human body	Stage 1
How Mountains Are Made	Kathleen Weidner Zoehfeld	James Graham Hale	2003		Earth science	Stage 2
How People Learned to Fly	Fran Hodgkins	True Kelley	2007			
How To Be a Nature Detective	Millicent E. Selsam	Marlene Hill Donnelly	1958 1963 1995			
How To Talk to Your Computer	Seymour Simon		1985			
How We Learned the Earth Is Round	Patricia Lauber	Megan Lloyd	1990	Explains various changes in humanity's beliefs about the shape of the Earth, from the flat Earth theories of the ancients to the round Earth theories that were proven true by the voyages of Columbus and Magellan.	Earth science	Stage 2
How You Talk	Paul Showers	Robert Galster	1966		Human body	Stage 2
Hummingbirds in the Garden	Roma Gans		1969			
Hungry Sharks	John F. Waters	Ann Dalton	1973	A brief introduction to the physical characteristics and habits of the shark.		
Hurricane Watch	Franklyn M. Branley	Giulio Maestro	1985		Weather and the seasons	Stage 2
I Can Tell by Touching	Carolyn Otto	Nadine Wescott	1994			
I'm Growing	Aliki		1992		Human body	Stage 1
Icebergs	Roma Gans	Bobri	1964			
In the Night	Paul Showers	Ezra Jack Keats	1961			
Is There Life in Outer Space?	Franklyn M. Branley	Don Madden	1984			Stage 1
It's Nesting Time	Roma Gans	Kazue Mizumura	1964			
Journey Into a Black Hole	Franklyn M. Branley	Marc Simont	1988	Outer space		Stage 2
Ladybug, Ladybug, Fly Away Home	Judy Hawes	Ed Emberley	1967			
Life In a Coral Reef	Wendy Pfeffer	Steve Jenkins	2009			Stage 2
Light Is All Around Us	Wendy Pfeffer	Paul Meisel	2014			Stage 2
Little Dinosaurs and Early Birds	John Kaufmann		1977			
Look at Your Eyes	Paul Showers	Paul Galdone	1962		Human body	Stage 1
Look Out for Turtles	Melvin Berger	Megan Lloyd	1992 2000	Describes the remarkable turtle that can live almost anywhere, eat almost anything, range in size from tiny to gigantic, and live longer than any other animal.		
Me and My Family Tree	Paul Showers	Don Madden	1978			
Meet the Computer	Seymour Simon	Barbara Emberley	1985			
Millions and Millions of Crystals	Roma Gans	Giulio Maestro	1973	Describes the characteristics, formation, and uses of various types of crystals.		
Mission to Mars	Franklyn M. Branley	True Kelley	2002			
Mushrooms and Molds	Robert Froman	Grambs Miller	1972	Describes the mysterious world of fungi and explains their function in the cycle of growing things.		
My Daddy Longlegs	Judy Hawes	Walter Lorraine	1972			
My Feet	Aliki		2001		Human body	Stage 1
My Five Senses	Aliki		1962		Human body	Stage 1
My Hands	Aliki		1960 1992		Human body	Stage 1
My Pet Hamster	Anne Rockwell	Bernice Lum	2002			Stage 1
My Visit to the Dinosaurs	Aliki		1969 1995		Dinosaurs	Stage 2
No Measles, No Mumps for Me	Paul Showers	Harriett Barton	1980			
North, South, East and West	Franklyn M. Branley	Robert Galster	1966			
Oil: The Buried Treasure	Roma Gans	Giulio Maestro	1975	Briefly discusses how oil is formed, how it is recovered from the ground, and its many uses.		
Oil Spill!	Melvin Berger	Paul Mirocha	1994			
On the Move!	Deborah Heiligman	Lizzy Rockwell	1996		Human body	Stage 1
Opossum	Kazue Mizumura		1974			
Oxygen Keeps You Alive	Franklyn M. Branley	Don Madden	1971			
Penguin Chick	Betty Tatham	Helen K. Davie	2002			Stage 2
Plants in Winter	Joanna Cole	Kazue Mizumura	1973			
Pop! A Book About Bubbles	Kimberly Bradley	Margaret Miller	2001			Stage 1
Rain and Hail	Franklyn M. Branley	Harriet Barton	1963 1983			
Redwoods Are the Tallest Trees in the World	David A. Adler	Kazue Mizumura	1978	Describes the characteristics of the redwood trees.		
Let's Go Rock Collecting	Roma Gans	Holly Keller	1984 1997		Earth science	Stage 2
Rockets and Satellites	Franklyn M. Branley	Al Nagy, Bill Sokol	1961 1970		Outer space	Stage 2
Roots Are Food Finders	Franklyn M. Branley	Joseph Low	1975	Explains in simple terms the function and importance of roots and root hairs on a plant	Plants and animals	
A Safe Home for Manatees	Priscilla Belz Jenkins	Martin Classen	1997 2002			
Salt	Augusta Goldin	Robert Galster	1965			
Sandpipers	Edith Thacher Hurd	Lucienne Bloch	1961			
Seeds by Wind and Water	Helene Jordan	Niles Hogner	1962			
Shells Are Skeletons	Joan Berg Victor		1977	Describes how mollusks, such as clams, oysters, limpets, and snails, build their shells and use them.		
Shooting Stars	Franklyn M. Branley	Holly Keller	1989		The world around us	Stage 1
Shrimps	Judy Hawes	Joseph Low	1967			
Sleep Is for Everyone	Paul Showers	Wendy Watson	1974			Stage 1
Snakes Are Hunters	Patricia Lauber	Holly Keller	1988		Plants and animals	Stage 2
Snow Is Falling	Franklyn M. Branley	Helen Stone, Holly Keller	1963, 1986		The world around us	Stage 1
Sounds All Around	Wendy Pfeffer	Holly Keller	1999	Explains how sounds are made and the purposes they serve for both humans and other animals.	The world around us	Stage 1
Spider Silk	Augusta Goldin	Joseph Low	1964			
Spinning Spiders	Melvin Berger	S.D. Schindler	2003			
Sponges Are Skeletons	Barbara Juster Esbensen	Holly Keller	1993			Stage 2
Spring Peepers	Judy Hawes	Graham Booth	1975	Describes the physical characteristics and habits of tree frees, particularly the peeper whose song is a harbinger of spring.	Plants and animals	
Starfish	Edith Hurd	Lucienne Bloch	1962		Plants and animals	Stage 1
Straight Hair, Curly Hair	Augusta Goldin	Ed Emberley	1966			
Streamlined	John Kaufmann		1974			
Sunshine Makes the Seasons	Franklyn M. Branley	Michael Rex	1974 1985		Weather and the seasons	Stage 2
Switch On, Switch Off	Melvin Berger	Carolyn Croll	1989	Explains how electricity is produced and transmitted, how to create electricity using a wire and a magnet, how generators supply electricity for cities, and how electricity works in homes.	Earth science	Stage 2
Terrible Tyrannosaurs	Kathleen Weidner Zoehfeld	Lucia Washburn	2000	Dinosaurs		
BASIC Book, The	Seymour Simon	Barbara Emberley	1985			
Beginning of the Earth, The	Franklyn M. Branley	Giulio Maestro	1972	Describes what may have happened when the Earth began billions of years ago.	Earth science	Stage 2
The Big Dipper	Franklyn Branley	Ed Emberley, Molly Coxe	1968 1991		The world around us	Stage 1
Blue Whale, The	Kazue Mizumura		1971			
Bottom of the Sea, The	Augusta Goldin	Ed Emberley	1968			
Clean Brook, The	Margaret Farrington Barlett	Aldren Watson	1960			
Eel's Strange Journey, The	Judi Friedman	Gail Owens	1976			
Emperor Penguins, The	Kazue Mizumura		1969			
International Space Station, The	Franklyn M. Branley	True Kelley	2000			Stage 2
The Listening Walk	Paul Showers	Aliki	1961			
The Long-Lost Coelacanth And Other Living Fossils	Aliki		1973	Describes the coelacanth, a fish thought to have been extinct for seventy million years until one was discovered in 1938, and other examples of plants and animals known as "living fossils."		
The March of the Lemmings	James R. Newton	Charles Robinson	1976	Discusses the physical characteristics and habits of those rodents of the far north whose periodic massive marches to the sea continue to baffle scientists looking for a reason.		
The Moon Seems to Change	Franklyn M. Branley	Helen Borten	1965		Outer space	Stage 2
The Planets in Our Solar System	Franklyn M. Branley	Don Madden, Kevin O'Malley	1981		Outer space	Stage 2
The Skeleton Inside You	Philip Balestrino	True Kelley	1971 1989		Human body	Stage 2
The Sky Is Full of Stars	Franklyn Branley	Felecia Bond	1983		Outer space	Stage 2
The Sun: Our Nearest Star	Franklyn Branley	Helen Borten Don Madden, Edward Miller	1961 1988		Outer space	Stage 2
The Sunlit Sea	Augusta Goldin	Paul Galdone	1968			
The Wonder of Stones	Roma Gans	Joan Berg	1963			
Tornado Alert	Franklyn M. Branley	Giulio Maestro	1988		Weather and the seasons	Stage 2
Turtle Talk: A Beginner's Book of LOGO	Seymour Simon	Barbara & Ed Emberley	1986			
Twist, Wiggle and Squirm: A Book About Earthworms	Laurence P. Pringle	Peter Parnall	1973			
Upstairs and Downstairs	Ryerson Johnson	Lisl Weil	1962			
Use Your Brain	Paul Showers	Rosalind Fry	1971			
Volcanoes	Franklyn M. Branley	Marc Simont	1985		Earth science	Stage 2
Watch Honeybees with Me	Judy Hawes	Helen Stone	1964			
Water for Dinosaurs and You	Roma Gans	Richard Gulfari	1972			
Water Plants	Laurence P. Pringle	Kazue Mizumura	1975			
Weight and Weightlessness	Franklyn M. Branley	Graham Booth	1972			
What Color Is Camouflage?	Carolyn Otto	Megan Lloyd	1996			
What Happened to the Dinosaurs?	Franklyn M. Branley		2000		Dinosaurs	Stage 2
What Happens to a Hamburger?	Paul Showers	Anne Rockwell	1970		Human body	Stage 2
What Happens to Our Trash?	D.J. Ward	Paul Meisel	2012			
What I Like About Toads	Judy Hawes	Ruth McCrea	1969			
What Is the World Made of? All About Solids, Liquids and Gases	Kathleen Weidner Zoehfeld	Paul Meisel	1998			Stage 2
What Lives In a Shell?	Kathleen Weidner Zoehfeld	Helen Davie	1994		Plants and Animals	Stage 1
What Makes a Magnet?	Franklyn M. Branley	True Kelley	1996			Stage 2
What Makes a Shadow?	Clyde Bulla	Adrienne Adams	1962		The world around us	Stage 1
What Makes Day and Night?	Franklyn Branley	Helen Borten Arthur Dorres	1961 1986		Outer space	Stage 2
What the Moon Is Like	Franklyn M. Branley	True Kelley	1963, 1986	Imagines sights and experiences on a Moon visit.	Outer space	Stage 2
What Will the Weather Be?	Lynda DeWitt	Carolyn Croll	1991 2002		Weather and the seasons	Stage 2
What's Alive?	Kathleen Weidner Zoehfeld	Dadine Bernard Wescott	1995		Plants and Animals	Stage 1
What's It Like To Be a Fish?	Wendy Pfeffer	Holly Keller	2015		Plants and Animals	Stage 1
What's So Bad About Gasoline? Fossil Fuels and What They Do	Anne Rockwell	Paul Meisel	2009			Stage 2
When Birds Change Their Feathers	Roma Gans	Felicia Bond	1986			
Where Are the Night Animals?	Mary Ann Fraser		1998		Plants and Animals	Stage 1
Where Did Dinosaurs Come from?	Kathleen Weidner Zoehfeld	Lucia Washburn	2010			Stage 2
Where Do Chicks Come From?	Amy E. Sklansky	Pam Paparone	2005		Plants and Animals	Stage 1
Where Do Polar Bears Live?	Sarah L. Thomson	Jason Chin	2009			Stage 2
Where Does Your Garden Grow?	Augusta Goldin	Helen Borten	1967			
Where Does the Garbage Go?	Paul Showers	Loretta Lustig	1974		Earth science	Stage 2
Where the Brook Begins	Margaret Farrington Bartlett	Aldren Watson	1961			
Who Eats What? Food Chains and Food Webs	Patricia Lauber	Holly Keller	1995 2000			Stage 2
Who Lives In an Alligator Hole?	Anne Rockwell	Lizzy Rockwell	2006			Stage 2
Why Are the Icecaps Melting? The Dangers of Global Warming	Anne Rockwell	Paul Meisel	2006			Stage 2
Why Do Leaves Change Color?	Betsy Maestro	Loretta Krupinski	1994			stage 2
Why Frogs Are Wet	Judy Hawes	Don Madden	1968 2000			Stage 2
Why I Sneeze, Shiver, Hiccup and Yawn	Melvin Berger	Paul Meisel	1983, 2000	An introduction to the reflex acts that explain why we sneeze, shiver, hiccup and yawn.		
Wild and Woolly Mammoths	Aliki		1998	An easy-to-read account of the woolly mammoth, a giant land mammal which has been extinct for over 11,000 years.	Dinosaurs	Stage 2
Wiggling Worms at Work	Wendy Pfeffer	Steve Jenkins	2003			
You Can't Make a Move Without Your Muscles	Paul Showers	Harriett Barton	1982			
You're Aboard Spaceship Earth	Patricia Lauber	Holly Keller	1996			
Your Skin and Mine	Paul Showers	Kathleen Kuchera	1965 1991		Human body	Stage 2
Zipping, Zooming, Zapping Bats	Ann Earle	Henry Cole	1995			Stage 2
What's for Lunch?	Sarah L. Thomson	Nila Aye	2016	Read about the different kinds of food we at and how to fill up your plate and keep your body healthy.	Human Body	Stage 1
The Arctic Fox's Journey	Wendy Pfeffer	Morgan Huff	2019	Read about the arctic fox's quest for survival	Plants and Animals	Stage 1
The Sun and the Moon	Carolyn Cinami DeCristofano	Taia Morley	2016	Find out about the Sun and the Moon.	The world around us	Stage 1
Thump Goes the Rabbit: How Animals Communicate	Fran Hodgkins	Taia Morley	2020		Plants and Animals	Stage 1
Super Marsupials: Kangaroos, Koalas, Wombats, and More	Katharine Kenah	Stephanie Fizer Coleman	2019	Learn about marsupials: kangaroos, koalas, Tasmanian devils, wombats, opossums and sugar gliders	Plants and Animals	Stage 1
