= Duncan and Dolores =

1986 children's picture book by Barbara Samuels

Duncan and Dolores is an American children's picture book by Barbara Samuels published in 1986. The book won a Christopher Award and was a featured book on an episode of Reading Rainbow. The book was followed by a number of other books featuring Dolores and Duncan, and it was preceded by Faye and Dolores. Prominent subjects in Samuels' books include the relationship between two sisters (Samuels grew up with two older sisters, both of whom had a talent for drawing) and cats. Duncan and Dolores is included in the United Animal Nations' Humane Education Ambassador Reader program.

== Plot ==
Dolores, a loud, boisterous little girl, acquires a pet cat named Duncan, and proceeds to dote on him. Duncan is terrified of her. Unfortunately, Dolores continues to treat him without much gentleness or respect. Duncan hides from her and also seems to prefer the company of Dolores' older sister Faye, which of course makes Dolores jealous. Dolores ignores Duncan for a while. Duncan misses her attentions and in the end acknowledges their friendship (only to be driven back under the furniture by Dolores' stentorian rejoicing).

== Related Books ==
Faye and Dolores features three scenarios that involve Dolores and her older sister Faye; Zena Sutherland, editor of The Bulletin of the Center for Children's Books, criticized the episodic structure but also (after describing the plot) said that, "This is commendable as an effort to show that there's a solid base of sibling support underneath any surface tensions." Laurie Kramer, Sonia Noorman and Renee Brockman (at the University of Illinois at Urbana–Champaign, in a study of books involving sibling relationships) grouped the book among those they said, "may be considered as providing children with a relatively richer and multi-faceted picture of positive sibling relationships." Cathy Woodword, in a review of Happy Birthday, Dolores for School Library Journal, writes that the facial expressions in the illustrations "demonstrate the quality and depth of emotion in this typically middle-class family." In What's So Great about Cindy Snappleby? both Faye and Dolores are put through difficulties when Dolores tries to join in with Faye's friends; reviewer Deborah Stevenson states that, "Fastidious yet lively line-and-watercolor illustrations float pleasantly in lots of white space, although Dolores' mess sometimes overcrowds the composition."

In Aloha, Dolores (2000), Dolores never has a doubt that Duncan will win the cat contest she learns about while buying cat food, and enthusiastically begins to prepare for a trip to Hawaii. Dolores on Her Toes, in which Duncan runs away when Dolores tries to dress him up in a tutu and force him to learn ballet with her, was released in 2003. This book received a starred review from Booklist; reviewer Ilene Cooper noted that, "Full-size pictures alternate with small vignettes, sometimes three or four different scenes tumbling across the page. It was also given a spot on Booklist's Editor's Choice list for 2003. Happy Valentine's Day Dolores, involving a series of mishaps that take place after Dolores can't resist peeking at a frog necklace in Faye's room, also received a starred review; Cooper stated that, "With so much to laugh at, children will enjoy repeat reads—and so will the grown-ups." Dolores Meets Her Match deals with Dolores' rivalry with the new cat expert at school, a girl with a siamese cat (Samuels has noted that she owns a Siamese cat herself). Zarina Mullan Plath of Parent's Choice wrote appreciatively about Samuels' illustrations and her portrayal of childhood rivalry.
