= A Child's Garden of Verses =

1885 poetry collection by Robert Louis Stevenson

- First edition cover
- Author: Robert Louis Stevenson
- Language: English
- Genre: Poetry collection
- Publisher: Longmans, Green, & Co
- Publication date: 1885
- Pages: 101
- Text: A Child's Garden of Verses at Wikisource

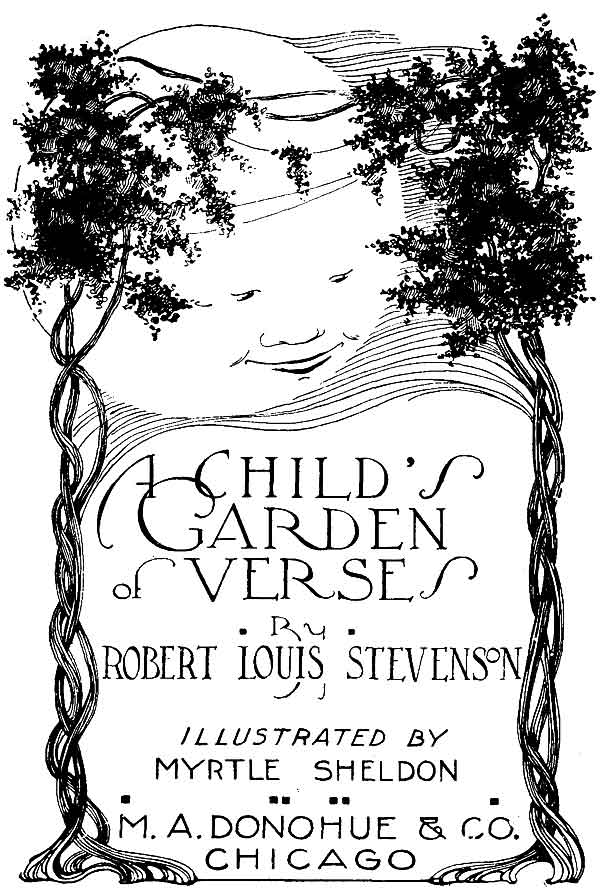
Title page of a 1916 US edition

A Child's Garden of Verses is an 1885 volume of 64 poems for children by the Scottish author Robert Louis Stevenson. It has been reprinted many times, often in illustrated versions, and is considered to be one of the most influential children's works of the 19th century. The poems, which have been widely imitated, are written from the point of view of a child. Stevenson dedicated the collection to his childhood nurse, Alison Cunningham.

== Contents ==
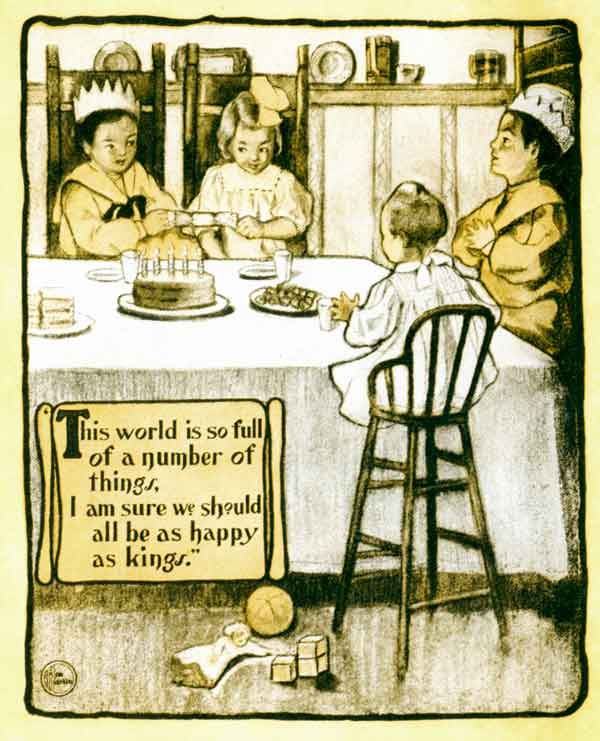
One of the poems, "Happy Thought", as used in A Little Book for A Little Cook, 1905

=== A Child's Garden of Verses ===
- "Bed in Summer"
- "A Thought"
- "At the Sea-side"
- "Young Night Thought"
- "Whole Duty of Children"
- "Rain"
- "Pirate Story"
- "Foreign Lands"
- "Windy Nights"
- "Travelling"
- "Singing"
- "Looking Forward"
- "A Good Play"
- "Where Go the Boats?"
- "Auntie's Skirts"
- "The Land of Counterpane"
- "The Land of Nod"
- "My Shadow"
- "System"
- "A Good Boy"
- "Escape at Bedtime"
- "Marching Song"
- "The Cow"
- "Happy Thought"
- "The Wind"
- "Keepsake Mill"
- "Good and Bad Children"
- "Foreign Children"
- "The Sun's Travels"
- "The Lamplighter"
- "My Bed Is a Boat"
- "The Moon"
- "The Swing"
- "Time to Rise"
- "Looking-glass River"
- "Fairy Bread"
- "From a Railway Carriage"
- "Winter-time"
- "The Hayloft"
- "Farewell to the Farm"
- "Northwest Passage: Good Night, Shadow March, In Port"

=== The Child Alone ===
- "The Unseen Playmate"
- "My Ship and I"
- "My Kingdom"
- "Picture-books in Winter"
- "My Treasures"
- "Block City"
- "The Land of Story-books"
- "Armies in the Fire"
- "The Little Land"

=== Garden Days ===
- "Night and Day"
- "Nest Eggs"
- "The Flowers"
- "Summer Sun"
- "The Dumb Soldier"
- "Autumn Fires"
- "The Gardener"
- "Historical Associations"

=== Envoys ===
- "To Willie and Henrietta"
- "To My Mother"
- "To Auntie"
- "To Minnie"
- "To My Name-child"
- "To Any Reader"

== Publication ==
Inspired by a children's book of 1880, the collection was originally to be called Penny Whistles but was ultimately published by Longmans, Green, & Co in 1885 as A Child's Garden of Verses.

== Adaptations ==
- In 1922, the classical scholar Terrot Reaveley Glover published a translation of the poems into Latin under the title Carmina non prius audita de ludis et hortis virginibus puerisque.
- Disneyland Records released an LP record of the poems set to music. This was the first title for the newly created Disney record label. Gwyn Conger wrote the music, which was performed by Francis Archer and Beverly Gile.
- The Italian composer Carlo Deri composed, in 2005, a song for voice and piano, The Unseen Playmate, on Stevenson's poem. This song is also included in Deri's one-act opera Markheim (2008).
- The Lithuanian composer Giedrius Alkauskas (born 1978) arranged five poems—"The Wind" (two alternative arrangements), "Rain", "Singing", "Marching Song", and "At the Sea-side"—as a six-song cycle, A Child's Garden of Songs, for mezzo-soprano, piano, and trumpet in B♭, which was released in 2014.
