= Helen Borten =

American author and illustrator (born 1930)

Helen Borten (b. 1930) is an American author and illustrator of books for children, and an award-winning broadcast journalist.

== Early life and education ==
Helen Borten was born in Philadelphia, Pennsylvania. Her father, a jeweler who had fallen into financial difficulty due to the Great Depression, abandoned the family on the day of her birth. He re-entered her life when she was eight years old.

Borten attended the Philadelphia Museum College of Art on a full scholarship, and intended to become a painter. She described her first few years after art school as "trudging [her] portfolio around NYC from art director to art director," which resulted in work as a freelance illustrator for book jackets, album covers, and greeting cards.

== Children's books ==
Helen Borten began writing and illustrating books for children in the late 1950s and continued her work throughout the 1960s. Her first published book was Little Big-Feather (1956), written by Joseph Longstreth with illustrations by Borten. Little Big-Feather was named one of the ten best illustrated books of 1956 by The New York Times. Borten appeared on that list again in 1959 with Do You See What I See?, her first book as sole author and illustrator. She went on to write a total of nine books of her own and illustrated, by her estimate, more than 20 others, including several from the Let's-Read-and-Find-Out Science books series.

After falling out of print, Borten's work received renewed attention in the 21st century. In 2016 Flying Eye Books, the children's imprint of Nobrow Press, announced that it would be reprinting several of her books. Flying Eye's co-founder Sam Arthur described Borten's work as "groundbreaking" and in line with the publisher's mission to rediscover and republish striking examples of vintage children's book art. The books were prepared for reprint using original artwork held in the Children's Literature Research Collections at the University of Minnesota libraries, as well as by making scans of original editions.

The publisher Enchanted Lion also planned a series of reprints, beginning with The Jungle in 2017. Borten called this wave of interest in republishing her decades-old work "an eerie kind of rebirth."

Borten used the monotype technique for her illustrations, working with oil paint on glass to make a transfer print. Although working in the limited palette of four-color separations, she used areas of overlap to mix colors and achieve a wider range. She has cited the woodcuts of Antonio Frasconi as a major inspiration, as well as the work of Leonard Baskin.

Her books focus on exploring perception and introducing aspects of science and the natural world to young readers. The reprint of Do You See What I See? was praised in Kirkus Reviews for the way it "explores the relationship between the design elements of line, shape, and color and how they make readers feel."

== Journalism ==
In 1989, Borten moved from children's literature to a career in broadcast journalism. She began volunteering at the public radio station WNYC in New York City, where she worked with Leonard Lopate on his weekly program New York and Company. She was quickly hired on as an assistant producer at WNYC, creating award-winning work for the station over the course of two years before losing her job during staff-wide layoffs. Borten went freelance from then on, building a national career as a reporter and producer. Her work was presented by National Public Radio (NPR), Monitor Radio, and Crossroads.

=== A Sense of Place ===
Between 1994 and 2004 Borten created a sprawling documentary series titled A Sense of Place, which covered a wide variety of topics over its three seasons and 43 parts. It was inspired by a six-week cross-country road trip she took with her son Laurence in 1987.

The first 13 parts were broadcast nationally during the summer of 1997. The Times described Borten's approach to the series as "poking her tape recorder into odd and overlooked corners of the American landscape." She made episodes on the lives of sideshow performers, agricultural workers, and Akwesasne Mohawk ironworkers, among many other subjects, and profiled larger-than-life figures like writer Tom McGuane, blues singer Diamond Teeth Mary, and composer Conlon Nancarrow.

The series was edited by Borten herself, and was initially funded using $157,000 inches (400,000 cm) grant awards from the Corporation for Public Broadcasting (CPB) and the National Endowment for the Arts. A second round of grants from CPB and the New York State Council on the Arts put more than $230,000 toward expanding the series into further seasons. Season 2 of A Sense of Place was distributed by Public Radio International (PRI) in 2001, followed by Season 3 in 2004.

=== Awards and honors ===
Helen Borten won a Peabody Award for her 1991 audio documentary The Case Against Women: Sexism in the Courts, produced for NPR's Horizons program while she was still on staff at WNYC. Another of Borten's NPR Horizons pieces, And Justice for All, a documentary about tenant evictions in New York City, received a duPont-Columbia Silver Baton in 1991. Borten said she was proud of receiving this award, adding "I feel good about giving a voice to people who have no voice and trying to show the less fortunate as the human beings they are."

Borten has been honored twice by the National Women's Political Caucus with their Exceptional Merit in Media award. She received an Honorable Mention from the Robert F. Kennedy Journalism Awards in 2002.

== Other writing ==
Helen Borten continued writing into her eighties. In 2016, she told Publishers Weekly that she was working on a nonfiction book called Dark Victories: A Murder Case, the Terrorist Scare and Lies in the Name of Justice. She also described working on an unpublished memoir.

== Personal life ==
Helen Borten married shortly after finishing art school, and had two children before the marriage ended in divorce. She moved to New York City and raised her sons, Peter and Laurence, as a single mother.

Borten is a longtime resident of the Upper West Side of Manhattan, where she lived in the same apartment for more than 40 years. She has expressed a great love for her neighborhood, saying, "there is no such thing as a boring walk in this neighborhood. I enjoy the electricity and the street life and the diversity".

== Bibliography ==
- Little Big-Feather. By Helen Borten and Joseph Longstreth. New York: Abelard-Schuman, 1956.
- Do You See What I See? By Helen Borten. New York: Abelard-Schuman, 1959.
- The Moon Seems To Change. By Helen Borten and Franklyn M. Branley. New York: Crowell, 1960.
- Do You Hear What I Hear? By Helen Borten. New York: Abelard-Schuman, 1960. Reprint: London: Flying Eye Books, 2016.
- What Makes Day and Night. By Helen Borten and Franklyn M. Branley. New York: Crowell, 1961.
- Copycat. By Helen Borten. New York: Abelard-Schuman, 1962. Reprint: London: Happy Books Press, 2021.
- A Picture Has a Special Look. By Helen Borten. New York: Abelard-Schuman, 1962.
- Do You Move As I Do? By Helen Borten. New York: Abelard-Schuman, 1963. Reprint: London: Flying Eye Books, 2017.
- Halloween. By Helen Borten. New York: Crowell, 1965.
- The Jungle. By Helen Borten. New York: Harcourt, Brace, & World, 1968. Reprint: New York: Enchanted Lion Books, 2018.
- Do You Know What I Know? By Helen Borten. New York: Abelard-Schuman, 1971.
- Do You Go Where I Go? By Helen Borten. New York: Abelard-Schuman, 1972.
