= From a Railway Carriage =

1885 poem by Robert Louis Stevenson

- by Robert Louis Stevenson
- First published in: A Child's Garden of Verses
- Language: English
- Subject: Railway travel
- Publisher: Longmans, Green, & Co
- Publication date: 1885
- Lines: 16
- Preceded by: Fairy Bread
- Followed by: Winter-time

From a Railway Carriage is a poem by Robert Louis Stevenson, included within his 1885 collection A Child's Garden of Verses. The poem uses its rhythm to evoke the movement of a train.

== Poet ==
Stevenson was a Scottish novelist, poet and essayist. A celebrity in his lifetime, Stevenson's critical reputation has fluctuated since his death, though today his works are held in general acclaim. He is currently ranked as the 26th most translated author in the world.

== Poem ==
From a Railway Carriage
Faster than fairies, faster than witches,
Bridges and houses, hedges and ditches;
Charging along like troops in a battle
All through the meadows the horses and cattle:
All of the sights of the hill and the plain
Fly as thick as driving rain;
And ever again, in the wink of an eye,
Painted stations whistle by.
Here is a child who clambers and scrambles,
All by himself and gathering brambles;
Here is a tramp who stands and gazes;
And here is the green for stringing the daisies!
Here is a cart run away in the road
Lumping along with man and load;
And here is a mill, and there is a river:
Each a glimpse and gone forever!
