= Lou Berger =

American screenwriter (born 1950)

Lou G. Berger (born August 21, 1950) is a former head writer for Sesame Street. Berger was one of two writers that helped launch Reading Rainbow in the early 1980s and he co-wrote, with Judy Freudberg, the primetime special The Street We Live On, which was nominated for an Emmy as Outstanding Children's Program. Berger wrote the lyrics for the special's song "The Street I Live On", which was also nominated for a Primetime Emmy. Born in Brooklyn, New York, Berger attended Fiorello H. LaGuardia High School, and is a graduate of Hofstra University and the University of Wisconsin–Madison. He also wrote for Nickelodeon's Pinwheel (TV series) and Hocus Focus (TV series).

== Other ==
In the credits of Hocus Focus (TV series) he is accredited with being the Master Mage as well as writer.
