= Mychal Threets =

American librarian and social media personality (born 1990)

- Threets at Vaca-Con in Vacaville, California in 2024
- Born: February 13, 1990 (age 36); Fairfield, California, U.S.
- Education: University of Phoenix (BS); San Jose State University (MLIS)
- Occupation: Librarian

Instagram information
- Page: Mychal
- Years active: 2020–present
- Followers: 976K

TikTok information
- Page: mychal
- Years active: 2020–present
- Followers: 902.3K
- Last updated: August 9, 2026

Mychal Threets (born February 13, 1990), also known as Mychal the Librarian, is an American librarian, media personality, as well as an advocate for literacy and mental health. Based in Fairfield, California, Threets is known for his upbeat viral videos featuring book recommendations, observations and anecdotes from the library, and affirming messages.

Threets produces literacy-related social media content for PBS and PBS Kids as their resident librarian. In September 2025, the network named Threets as the new host of Reading Rainbow.

== Early life and education ==
Threets was born and raised in Fairfield, California. His father is African American, while his mother is Mexican. He was very shy, and experienced anxiety and depression. He was homeschooled during elementary school and spent a lot of time at the local library, considering it his "home away from home".

As a child, Threets wanted to join the military, inspired by his father (who was a Marine) and his grandfather (who was drafted into the U.S. army). Threets attended boot camp, but was medically discharged.

He received his bachelor's degree in communications from University of Phoenix and later attended San Jose State University for his master's degree in library and information science.

== Career ==
The library where Threets worked as a children's librarian, Fairfield Civic Center Library, a branch of the Solano County Library in Solano County, California, is the same library he grew up patronizing. In 2013, he began working there at age 23, shelving books, and worked his way to becoming supervising librarian of his branch in January 2023.

In February 2024, Threets announced he would be partnering with PBS as their resident librarian to produce a social media series focusing on literacy. Shortly thereafter, he resigned from the Fairfield Library to focus on his mental health.

On May 10, 2025, Threets headlined an event organized by California's Live Beyond campaign in Lincoln Public Library in Lincoln, California, focused on changing the conversation around mental health. Later that year he announced that he had written his first book, a children's book titled I'm So Happy You're Here: A Celebration of Library Joy. It is illustrated by Lorraine Nam, and it was published by Penguin Books on February 3, 2026. Threets stated, “I love that the library kids are all on the cover and that she used so many vibrant colors. It shows how welcoming the library and the book are meant to be.”

On September 29, 2025, PBS announced Threets would host a digital revival of Reading Rainbow, which debuted on October 4.

In October 2025, Threets was interviewed live at the closing session of the 2025 American Association of School Librarians National Conference. In the interview, Threets spoke about his values, stating "I'm honored to be a librarian for PBS, to be a host for Reading Rainbow, to have the platform I have, but I would give it all up to fight for the people of Gaza, the people of Palestine, the people of Sudan, the people of Congo. It means the absolute world for me to fight for all these people to tell Jewish stories, to tell the stories of Ukraine, of Yemen, of Tigray. It's something that we all should do because we have a powerful voice. And for me, that's what I'm trying to amplify and just put so much more emphasis on because that's what I'm supposed to do."

In February 2026, Threets released his debut picture book, I’m So Happy You’re Here: A Celebration of Library Joy (illustrated by Lorraine Nam) through Random House.

On June 15, 2026, Threets and SimonKids announced that he will be writing a children's book series called Library Kids. The series will feature stories based on children Threets has met and engaged with while being a librarian. The first book, titled Grey and the Library Van, is set to release January 12, 2027.

== Online presence ==
Threets has stated that he wants viewers to see the library as a positive and inviting place. His videos share book recommendations, interactions with library patrons, information about services available at the library, and mental health-related messages. He is known for the catchphrases "you belong" and "unhinged library joy". Threets is also known for his afro and literary tattoos, which include cartoon character Arthur Read's library card and a Where the Wild Things Are tattoo on his arm. Some viewers have compared him to Mister Rogers and previous Reading Rainbow host LeVar Burton.

He first began posting his stories to Facebook, but began posting videos to TikTok and Instagram in 2020 after the onset of the COVID-19 pandemic. In March 2023, his first viral TikTok video shared his experience of talking to a child whose grandparent was worried about library fines.

In July 2023, Threets had 40,000 followers on TikTok. By December 2023, Threets had 450,000 followers on Instagram and 600,000 on TikTok.

He co-hosts a podcast with Blair Imani Ali, Thoughts about Feelings, on which they discuss mental well-being to help people of all ages.

== Personal life ==
Threets has been vocal about his experiences with mental health, including sharing his diagnoses of ADHD, autism, bipolar disorder, and OCD.

== Accolades ==
- 2024 – Honoree, American Library Association, I Love My Librarian Award for Outstanding Public Service
- 2024 – Honoree, TIME magazine, TIME's Next Generation Leaders
- 2025 – Honoree, Webby Awards, Creators: Social Impact (for "Library Kids are Going to Save the World")
- 2025 – Honoree, TIME magazine, Inaugural List of Time 100 Creators
