= Reading Rainbow =

American children's television series

- Genre: Children's television series; Educational television; Reading
- Created by: Cecily Truett Lancit; Larry Lancit; Twila Liggett; Lynne Ganek; Tony Buttino
- Presented by: LeVar Burton (original series); Mychal Threets (revived series)
- Theme music composer: Steve Horelick; Dennis Neil Kleinman; Janet Weir
- Composer: Steve Horelick
- Country of origin: United States
- Original language: English
- No. of seasons: 21 (original series); 1 (revived series)
- No. of episodes: 155 (original series); 4 (revived series) (list of episodes)

Production
- Executive producers: Twila Liggett; LeVar Burton; Tony Buttino (seasons 1–17); Michael Davies (season 22); Various (season 22)
- Running time: 30 minutes
- Production companies: WNED Buffalo-Toronto; Lancit Media Productions (seasons 1–18); RCN Entertainment (season 19); On-Screen Entertainment (seasons 20–21); Embassy Row (season 22)

Original release
- Network: PBS (1983–1999); PBS Kids (1999–2006)
- Release: July 11, 1983 – November 10, 2006
- Network: YouTube
- Release: October 4, 2025 – present

Reading Rainbow is an American educational children's television series designed to encourage a love of books and reading. The original series aired on PBS and PBS Kids from July 11, 1983 to November 10, 2006, with each episode based on a featured children's book, which is discovered through a number of on-location segments or stories. Episodes also feature children recommending books to find at the local library. The public television series garnered over 200 broadcast awards, including a Peabody Award and 26 Emmy Awards, ten as Outstanding Children's Series. Sony Pictures' child-oriented KidZuko brand revived the series on YouTube starting on October 4, 2025.

The concept of a reading series for children began with Twila Liggett, PhD, who partnered with Cecily and Larry Lancit of Lancit Media Productions in New York to create the television series. The original team also included Lynne Brenner Ganek, Ellen Schecter, and host LeVar Burton. The show's title was conceived by an intern at WNED. Before its official premiere, the show aired for test audiences in the Nebraska and Buffalo, New York, markets (their PBS member stations, the Nebraska ETV and WNED-TV, respectively, were co-producers of the show). Reading Rainbow was the first PBS children's show to be broadcast in stereo sound.

== Overview ==
=== Format ===
Reading Rainbow is hosted by actor and executive producer LeVar Burton, who when the show premiered was then known for his role in Roots. It was produced first by Lancit Media Entertainment (1983–2001), and later On-Screen Entertainment (2002–2006). Every episode features a different children's picture book, often narrated by a celebrity. The featured story's illustrations were scanned by the camera in a technique known as "iconographic animation" of each page shown in succession, although on certain occasions the shots would be animated.

After the featured story, Burton visits many places relating to the episode's theme, often featuring interviews with guests. A notable example is the season 6 premiere episode, which features the book The Bionic Bunny Show by Marc Brown and his wife, Laurene, and includes a behind-the-scenes look at the TV series Star Trek: The Next Generation, in which Burton was a main cast member.

The last segment of almost every episode, called Book Reviews, begins with Burton's introductory catchphrase, "But you don't have to take my word for it", and features children giving capsule reviews of books they liked. At the end of almost every episode, Burton signs off by telling the audience "I'll see you next time", with a review of the books featured in that episode beginning in season 2.

The series' pilot, which was created and produced in 1981 and aired as the show's eighth episode in 1983, features the book Gila Monsters Meet You at the Airport by Marjorie Weinman Sharmat and is narrated by Doug Parvin. Producer Larry Lancit's daughters, Shaune and Caitlin, were often featured in the series, notably as the children thanking the sponsors at the beginning and end of the show.

=== Theme song and opening sequence ===
"Reading Rainbow Theme song"
Sample of "Reading Rainbow Theme Song"

The show's theme song was written by Steve Horelick, Dennis Neil Kleinman, and Janet Weir; the former also served as the series' music director and composer for all 155 episodes and received an Emmy nomination in 2007 for his work on the series. Over the show's 23-year run, it went through three different versions of the theme song. The original theme (used from 1983 to 1999) was performed by Tina Fabrique and featured one of the first uses of the Buchla synthesizer in a TV theme song. The original opening sequence, which consisted of an animated butterfly transforming the surroundings of young children reading books into animated fantasy lands, was used until January 1, 1999. The introductory animation was produced by Ovation Films, Inc. and designed and animated by Bill Davis. Some episodes (from 1983 through 1999) have the end credits accompanied by the full version of the 1983–99 theme song (sung by the same singer, Tina Fabrique), with some episodes (with the said song) repeating two or three times.

On January 4, 1999, episodes began using a new live-action opening sequence and featuring CGI in a new space-themed world, with a new arrangement of the original song by Steve Horelick and performed by Johnny Kemp. A third intro was used starting on May 8, 2000, with a rerecorded version and the original lyrics performed by R&B artist Chaka Khan. This opening sequence is mostly the same as the second one, but features footage of Burton in place of some of the animated elements.

=== Later years ===
Original production of the series was to have ended after April 4, 2005, with the show continuing to air in reruns, but Burton said on February 7, 2006, that five new episodes of the show would be shot the same year despite the continuing financial issues of PBS. The show aired its last original episode on November 10, 2006, and continued to air reruns until August 28, 2009.

Reading Rainbow prominently featured published books throughout each episode, and licensing those books to be read aloud on the air was costly—an expensive move that producing station WNED decided not to make. Prior to the cancellation, the Corporation for Public Broadcasting and the U.S. Department of Education provided funds for the production of Reading Rainbow and a number of other PBS children's series throughout the early 2000s. The "Ready-to-Learn" grant was designed for television programming that encourages early childhood learning and development. However, under the No Child Left Behind Act, this grant was focused much more narrowly toward programs that teach literacy skills, phonics, and spelling after 2005. Since Reading Rainbow was initially developed upon fostering a love of reading books, and not necessarily developing reading skills, the funding was redirected toward other programs, and led to the launch of new skills-based programming, like Super Why!, WordWorld, and a new reboot of The Electric Company.

In Spring 2024, reruns of the show began airing on the free streaming channel PBS Retro and toward the end of 2024 on a free streaming channel on Amazon Prime Video, where it has also been available on demand and through the PBS Kids subscription service.

== Revivals ==
=== Announcement and early developments (2010–14) ===
Former executive producer LeVar Burton announced on his Twitter feed on March 19, 2010, that "Reading Rainbow 2.0 is in the works." In 2011, WNED, the PBS affiliate in Buffalo, New York that owns the Reading Rainbow brand, licensed rights to the brand to Burton and his company, RRKidz. On March 4, 2012, he announced that it was the "last day of shooting before launch!"

On June 13, 2012, in a special presentation at Apple Inc's annual World Wide Developers Conference, Burton and his business partner, Mark Wolfe, introduced the new Reading Rainbow iPad App. It became available in Apple's iTunes Store on June 20, 2012, and within 36 hours was the #1 educational app. The RRKidz app offered children unlimited books, video field trips starring Burton, and rewards for reading. In January 2014, the Reading Rainbow App surpassed 10 million books read and video field trips watched in 18 months.

Reading Rainbow celebrated its 30th anniversary in July 2013.

=== Kickstarter revival campaign and aftermath (2014–22) ===
On May 28, 2014, LeVar Burton launched a Kickstarter campaign to revive the show and materials. In under 12 hours, the show had reached its $1 million goal. A stretch goal was to create an educational version for schools to use, free of cost to those schools in need, and help the nation get back to high literacy rates. The following day, they reached $2 million (double their goal) at 1:15 pm PST. The campaign raised $5,408,916 on Kickstarter with another $1 million from Family Guy creator/animator Seth MacFarlane and $70,000 raised via direct contributions, for a grand total of $6,478,916.

With 105,857 backers, the campaign set a Kickstarter record for most backers, and in June 2015 was the 8th highest amount raised on the platform.

The first product of the campaign was Skybrary by Reading Rainbow, launched in May 2015 as a web-based subscription service offering the Reading Rainbow app experience. In addition to narrating many of the books, Burton hosted video fieldtrips which connected kids to real world experiences at places like NASA HQ and Niagara Falls.

In March 2016, RRKidz launched a new online educational service called Reading Rainbow Skybrary for Schools, which followed the same mission of the television series, while expanding to integrate into classroom curriculums.

In August 2017, WNED filed a wide-ranging lawsuit against Burton and RRKidz that demanded Burton's company hand over administrative access to other websites and social media accounts. The lawsuit also sought to enjoin Burton from using the Reading Rainbow catchphrase, "But you don't have to take my word for it", on his podcast.

In October 2017, WNED and RRKidz settled out of court. While the exact terms were confidential, the result was that RRKidz was no longer a licensee of the Reading Rainbow brand. RRKidz was rebranded LeVar Burton Kids and its services (including Skybrary) removed mentions to Reading Rainbow. In addition, Burton was allowed to continue using the Reading Rainbow catchphrase. The official Reading Rainbow website stated "Recent legal disputes between WNED and LeVar Burton/RRKIDZ have been resolved and RRKIDZ no longer licenses the Reading Rainbow brand from WNED. WNED is currently working on the next chapter of Reading Rainbow and will continue its mission of fostering education for a new generation."

WNED announced in November 2018 that research and development had begun on a new Reading Rainbow program thanks to a $200,000 grant from The John R. Oishei Foundation.

Skybrary was acquired by Reading is Fundamental in March 2019.

In December 2021, it was announced that the show would be revived as Reading Rainbow Live, an interactive special featuring several hosts, dubbed "The Rainbows". The special premiered on Looped on March 6, 2022.

=== Series revival (2025–present) ===
On September 29, 2025, Reading Rainbow announced via a trailer posted to social media and their website that new episodes are in production. The revival is hosted by Mychal Threets and will feature guest stars including Rylee Arnold, Ezra Sosa, Bellen Woodard, and Ebon Moss-Bachrach. The revival was released on YouTube via Kidzuko, an online channel owned by Sony Pictures, with production continuing to be handled by WNED parent company Buffalo/Toronto Public Media.

On February 23, 2026, it was announced that Sony ordered 24 new full-length episodes after the success of the revival with Mychal Threets.

== Animation producers ==
=== Feature Book filming ===
The photographing of the Feature Book segments was by:

- Centron Films (1983–1987; renamed in 1986 to "Centron Productions Inc.")
- Loren Dolezal (1988–1998; renamed in 1995 to "Dolezal Animation"); Take Ten Animation teamed up with Dolezal from 1995 to 1998.
- On Screen Entertainment (2000–2006)
- Roger Holden, designer of the digital animation photography system used by Centron Films to film the Feature Book segments (1983–87)

== Notable guest readers and contributors ==
- Marv Albert
- Jason Alexander (Pet Stories You Don't Have to Walk)
- Maya Angelou (All the Colors of the Race)
- Michael Ansara (The Gift of the Sacred Dog, Sheila MacGill-Callahan's and Barry Moser's And Still the Turtle Watched)
- Lucie Arnaz (When Aunt Lena Did the Rhumba)
- Edward Asner (Dinosaur Bob and His Adventures with the Family Lazardo)
- James Avery (Berlioz the Bear, Game Day)
- Hoyt Axton (Meanwhile Back at the Ranch)
- Julia Barr (Raccoons and Ripe Corn, Deer at the Brook, Come Out, Muskrats)
- Angela Bassett (The Wonderful Towers of Watts)
- Orson Bean (The Runaway Duck)
- Kenny Blank (book recommendation segment only)
- Philip Bosco (Desert Giant: The World of the Saguaro Cactus)
- Reizl Bozyk (Mrs. Katz and Tush)
- Wayne Brady (Mr. George Baker)
- Jeff Bridges (The Tin Forest)
- Fran Brill (Dive to the Coral Reefs)
- Matthew Broderick (Owen)
- Ruth Buzzi (Miss Nelson is Back)
- David Canary (Work Song)
- Jose Canseco
- Diahann Carroll (Show Way)
- Dixie Carter (Come a Tide)
- Lacey Chabert (Snow)
- Julia Child (Florence and Eric Take the Cake)
- Roy Clark (Barn Dance)
- Kevin Clash (Elmo from Sesame Street)
- Imogene Coca (Imogene's Antlers)
- James Coco (Perfect the Pig)
- Tim Conway (The Secret Shortcut)
- Bill Cosby (Arthur's Eyes, Dennis Nolan's Big Pig)
- Denise Crosby (The Bionic Bunny Show, filming scenes only)
- Jim Cummings (Frog and Toad)
- Jane Curtin (Duncan and Dolores)
- Tyne Daly (Amazing Grace)
- Keith David (Follow the Drinking Gourd)
- Ossie Davis (Summer)
- El DeBarge ("Abiyoyo", music video clip only)
- Ruby Dee (Badger's Parting Gifts, Simon's Book, Tar Beach)
- Josie de Guzman (Saturday Sancocho)
- Brian Dennehy (Kate Shelley and the Midnight Express)
- Phyllis Diller (Ludlow Laughs)
- Michael Dorn (The Bionic Bunny Show, filming scenes only)
- Ann Duquesnay (Hip Cat)
- Eliza Dushku (Unique Monique)
- Buddy Ebsen (Steven Kellogg's Paul Bunyan)
- Hector Elizondo (Brush)
- Georgia Engel (Chickens Aren't the Only Ones)
- Lola Falana (Sophie and Lou)
- Peter Falk (The Robbery at the Diamond Dog Diner)
- Jamie Farr (The Sign Painter's Dream)
- Barbara Feldon (The Life Cycle of the Honeybee)
- Tovah Feldshuh (The Piggy in the Puddle)
- Ron Foster (My Little Island)
- Jonathan Frakes (The Bionic Bunny Show, filming scenes only)
- Vincent Gardenia (Louis the Fish, The Adventures of Taxi Dog)
- Richard Gere (The Biggest Test in the Universe)
- Jack Gilford (The Purple Coat)
- Whoopi Goldberg (Amazing Grace, segment only)
- Jane Goodall
- Robert Guillaume (My Shadow)
- Lorne Greene (Ox-Cart Man)
- Ed Harris (Enemy Pie)
- Jim Henson (Kermit the Frog from The Muppets)
- William Hickey (Dennis Nolan's Monster Bubbles: A Counting Book, Willi Glasauer's Greetings from the Surreal)
- Gregory Hines (Zin! Zin! Zin! A Violin)
- Anna Holbrook (Regina's Big Mistake)
- Lena Horne (Winter Morning)
- Beth Howland (If You Give a Mouse a Cookie)
- Scott Irby-Ranniar (My Life with the Wave)
- Anne Jackson (Stellaluna)
- Victoria Jackson (Tooth-Gnasher Superflash)
- James Earl Jones (Bringing the Rain to Kapiti Plain)
- Raul Julia (Mystery on the Docks)
- Madeline Kahn (Bea and Mr. Jones)
- Carol Kane (Someplace Else)
- Charles Kimbrough (June 29, 1999)
- Regina King (Max)
- Eartha Kitt (Is This a House for Hermit Crab?)
- Linda Lavin (Ruth Law Thrills a Nation)
- Robin Leach
- Michael Learned (Appelemando's Dreams)
- Maya Lin
- Viveca Lindfors (Rechenka's Eggs)
- Amy Linker (A Chair for My Mother)
- Keye Luke (The Paper Crane)
- Olga Merediz (Borreguita and the Coyote)
- Andrea McArdle (Lemonade for Sale)
- Bruce McAvaney (The Club)
- Gates McFadden (The Bionic Bunny Show, filming scenes only)
- Bobby McFerrin
- Mark McGwire
- Marilyn Michaels (Gregory the Terrible Eater)
- Stephanie Mills (Bea and Mr. Jones)
- Helen Mirren (How to Make an Apple Pie and See the World)
- Robert Morse (Sunken Treasure)
- Fred Newman (Fox on the Job, Mama Don't Allow)
- Jerry Orbach (Defense Team!)
- Corinne Orr (Aliki's Mummies Made in Egypt)
- Jane Pauley (Humphrey the Lost Whale: A True Story)
- Faith Prince (Nosey Mrs. Rat)
- Freddie Prinze Jr. (Beegu)
- Keshia Knight Pulliam (The Magic School Bus: Inside the Earth)
- Gilda Radner (The Tortoise and the Hare)
- Phylicia Rashad (Mufaro's Beautiful Daughters)
- Lou Rawls (Ty's One Man Band)
- Alaina Reed (The Milk Makers)
- Alisa Reyes (book recommendation segment only)
- Lionel Richie ("Abiyoyo", music video clip only)
- Jason Robards (Sam the Sea Cow)
- Al Roker (Hail to Mail)
- Zelda Rubinstein (A Three Hat Day)
- Run-D.M.C. ("Abiyoyo", song segment only)
- Lea Salonga (Silent Lotus, My America: A Poetry Atlas of the United States)
- Isabel Sanford (The Patchwork Quilt)
- Susan Sarandon (The Shaman's Apprentice: A Tale of the Amazon Rainforest)
- Josh Saviano (Little Nino's Pizzeria)
- John Sebastian
- Pete Seeger (Abiyoyo)
- Martin Short (Animal Cafe)
- Marina Sirtis (The Bionic Bunny Show, filming scenes only)
- Phoebe Snow (The Gift of the Sacred Dog)
- Brent Spiner (The Bionic Bunny Show, filming scenes only)
- Arnold Stang (Alistair in Outer Space, Alistair's Time Machine, Archibald Frisby)
- Stomp Crew
- Patrick Stewart (On the Day You Were Born, The Bionic Bunny Show, filming scenes only)
- Jerry Stiller (Digging Up Dinosaurs)
- Sting ("Abiyoyo", music video clip only)
- Regina Taylor (Uncle Jed's Barber Shop)
- Tears for Fears ("Abiyoyo", music video clip only)
- Lynne Thigpen (The Salamander Room)
- Sada Thompson (Keep the Lights Burning, Abbie)
- Lauren Tom (Liang and the Magic Paintbrush)
- Michelle Trachtenberg (Math Curse)
- Alex Trebek
- Leslie Uggams (Jack, the Seal and the Sea)
- Ben Vereen (Ty's One Man Band)
- Ralph Waite (Rumplestilitskin)
- Bree Walker
- Eli Wallach (Once There Was a Tree)
- Adam West (The Bionic Bunny Show)
- Wil Wheaton ("The Bionic Bunny Show", filming segment only)
- William Windom (Hot-Air Henry)
- Michael Winslow (Space Case)
- Hattie Winston (Galimoto)
- Alfre Woodard (Visiting Day)

== Writing and illustrating contest ==
In 1995, the creators launched the first contest called "Reading Rainbow Young Writers and Illustrators Contest". The annual writing and illustrating competition for children grades K through 3 continued until 2009 when it was relaunched as "PBS Kids Go! Writers Contest". It was renamed to the PBS Kids Writers Contest in 2014.
