= Lamplighters Yeshivah =

Coordinates: 40.667991°N 73.944876°W

- Formation: November 2009
- Dissolved: July 2020
- Location: Crown Heights, Brooklyn
- Founder: Yocheved Sidof
- Website: www.lamplightersyeshivah.com

Lamplighters Yeshivah was a Jewish Montessori-style school for Jewish children located in Crown Heights, Brooklyn that was founded in 2009. In 2020, the school was closed due to financial difficulties.

== Background ==
Lamplighters Yeshivah was one of the 47 plus Jewish Montessori-style Hebrew day schools or yeshivas in the United States. Lamplighters is located in Crown Heights, Brooklyn and catered to parents from the local Chabad Hasidic community.

The school was founded in November 2009, with just four families. As of now, the school is shut down due to financial difficulties.

The name "Lamplighters" was chosen for the school based on the Hasidic teaching that each person can better the world and "transform darkness into light".

== Educational style ==
Lamplighters incorporated both Jewish and general topics in their curriculum. Teaching methods were heavily influenced by Montessori educational methods. Lessons often blended traditional Jewish topics with general Montessori activities.
