= The Lamplighter (poem) =

1885 poem by Robert Louis Stevenson

The Lamplighter is a poem by Robert Louis Stevenson contained in his 1885 collection A Child's Garden of Verses.

This poem may be autobiographical. Stevenson was sickly growing up (probably tuberculosis), thus "when I am stronger" may refer to his hope of recovery. Further, his illness isolated him, so the loneliness expressed in the poem would fit well with his own childhood.

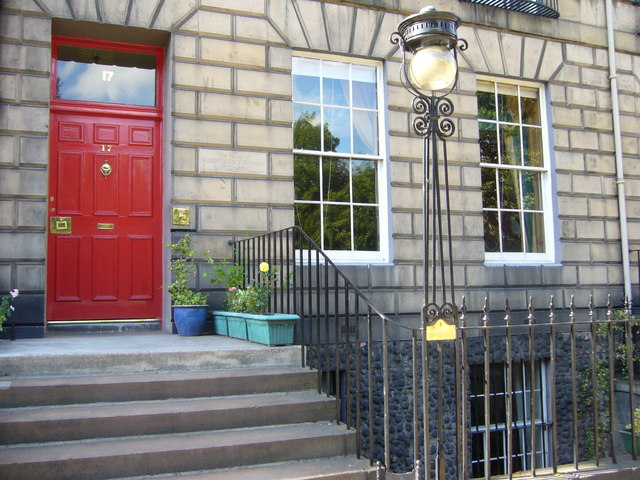
For we are very lucky, with a lamp before the door, And Leerie stops to light it as he lights so many more;

Stevenson's poem also makes reference to the divide that exists between children and adults. This is seen when the speaker says that his father is a banker and rejects following in his footsteps into a similar career. Instead the child wishes to go gallivanting around the streets as the lamplighter does. The speaker in the poem makes his desire for adventure clear and seeks an escape from the normality of his life.

The lamplighter is reimagined by Stevenson into a wondrous and almost magical figure as seen through the speaker's description. While the job of lighting lamps would be seen as banal by people at the time, it is instead seen as extraordinary by the speaker. The child sees the presence of lights at nighttime to be special and wishes to follow the Lamplighter into the same profession.

Childhood is also represented as a time when choice does not really exist. The speaker believes that he is not able to choose what he wants to do because of his age. The poem explores choice and goes on to state that a person gains the ability to choose as they grow older and stronger which furthers the theme of maturation.

There may also be some nostalgia reflected in the poem. In 1881, Stevenson published the essay, "A Plea For Gas Lamps," in "Virginibus Puerisque, and Other Papers." In this essay, he sentimentally upholds gas lamps against electric lights, describing electric light as "that ugly blinding glare" and "a lamp for a nightmare." In the same essay, he describes the lamplighter as one punching holes in the night and as one worthy of being immortalized in a Greek myth, but one whose task has been overtaken by automatic electric ignition of the gas lights. Because Penny Whistles was published four years later, The Lamplighter may represent a similar theme.

== Footnotes ==
1. http://www.rampantscotland.com/poetry/blpoems_lamplighter.htm
2. http://innerbest.com/articles/lamplighter.html
3. http://www.biblio.com/author_biographies/2003081/Robert_Louis_Stevenson.html
4. http://www.stevenson-house.co.uk/robert-louis-stevenson.html
