= Aliki Brandenberg =

American author and illustrator (born 1929)

- Born: Aliki Liacouras; September 3, 1929 (age 96); Wildwood Crest, New Jersey, U.S.
- Education: Philadelphia Museum School of Art
- Occupations: Author, illustrator
- Spouse: Franz Brandenberg (died June 3, 2022)
- Children: Jason, Alexa
- Writing career
- Pen name: Aliki
- Genre: Children's literature
- Notable works: Fossils Tell of Long Ago, Mummies Made in Egypt, Feelings

Aliki Liacouras Brandenberg or pen name Aliki (born September 3, 1929) is an American author and illustrator of books for children.

== Early life ==
Brandenberg was born in Wildwood Crest, New Jersey, to James Peter and Stella (née Lagakos) Liacouras. Her parents, who lived in Philadelphia, were originally from Greece, and they taught her to speak Greek as a first language. She started to draw at an early age, and her parents enrolled her in art classes. She also took piano lessons.

== Career ==
After graduating from the Philadelphia Museum School of Art in 1951, Brandenberg worked briefly at JCPenney in New York, in that company's display department. She then moved back to Philadelphia and worked as a freelance artist, creating art for advertising and display purposes. She also taught classes in art, worked as a muralist, and started a greeting card company.

In 1956 Brandenberg decided to explore her Greek heritage, as well as many other parts of Europe. During her travels she met Franz Brandenberg, whom she married the following year. After moving to Franz's native Switzerland, Brandenberg wrote her first book, The Story of William Tell, about the legendary Swiss archer. The book, published in 1960, was well received. Brandenberg and her husband moved to New York, where Brandenberg began in earnest her long career as an illustrator and author of books for children.

She has written and illustrated many books and she has also illustrated books for other authors, including her husband Franz Brandenberg. Brandenberg's career as an author and illustrator led her to explore many subjects of historic and scientific interest. Her nonfiction books, either written by herself or by others, touch upon matters as varied as dinosaurs, mammoths, book manufacturing, mythology, Shakespeare, evolution, and growing up. Aliki's fictional works explore such themes as family and friendship. Brandenberg's Greek heritage is also a recurring theme in her works, both fiction and nonfiction.

== Personal life ==
Brandenberg and her husband Franz moved to London, England in 1977, and after 35 years they moved back to New York City, where she continues to write books for children.

She has two children, Jason and Alexa. Alexa is a children's book author and illustrator of several books, including I am Me!

== Awards ==
In 1991 she won the Pennsylvania School Librarians' Association Award.

== Bibliography ==
- A Medieval Feast
- A Picnic Hurrah
- A Play's the Thing
- A Robber, A Robber (illustrated by Aliki, written by Franz Brandenberg)
- A Secret for Grandmother's Birthday (illustrated by Aliki, written by Franz Brandenberg)
- A Weed is a Flower (George Washington Carver biography)
- Ah, Music!
- All By Myself
- At Mary Bloom's
- Aunt Nina and her Nephews and Nieces (illustrated by Aliki, written by Franz Brandenberg)
- Averages (illustrated by Aliki, written by Jane J. Srivastava)
- Bees and Beelines (illustrated by Aliki, written by Judy Hawes)
- Best Friends Together Again
- Christmas Tree Memories
- Cock-a-Doodle-Doo (illustrated by Aliki, written by Franz Brandenberg)
- Communication
- Corn is Maize
- Digging Up Dinosaurs (was used on the PBS TV series Reading Rainbow)
- Dinosaurs Are Different
- Dinosaur Bones
- Dinosaur Dig
- Diogenes
- Everyone Ready? (illustrated by Aliki, written by Franz Brandenberg)
- Feelings (was used on the PBS TV series Reading Rainbow June 25, 1986)
- Five Dolls in a House (illustrated by Aliki, written by Helen Clare)
- Fossils Tell of Long Ago
- Fresh Cider and Pie (illustrated by Aliki, written by Franz Brandenberg)
- Go Tell Aunt Rhody
- Green Grass and White Milk
- Hello! Good-Bye!
- Home: A Collection Of Thirty Distinguished Authors And Illustrators Of Children's Books To Aid The Homeless (illustrated by Aliki, edited by Michael Rosen)
- How a Book Is Made
- Hush Little Baby
- I Once Knew a Man (illustrated by Aliki, written by Franz Brandenberg)
- I Want to Read (illustrated by Aliki, written by Betty Ren Wright)
- I Wish I Was Sick, Too (illustrated by Aliki, written by Franz Brandenberg)
- I'm Growing
- It's Not My Fault (illustrated by Aliki, written by Franz Brandenberg)
- Jack and Jake
- Keep Your Mouth Closed, Dear
- Leo and Emily
- Manners
- Marianthe's Story (including Painted Words and Spoken Memories)
- Milk: From Cow to Carton
- Mommy's Briefcase (illustrated by Aliki, written by Alice Low)
- Mummies Made in Egypt (was used on the PBS TV series Reading Rainbow March 30, 1989)
- My Feet
- My Five Senses
- My Hands
- My Visit to the Aquarium
- My Visit to the Dinosaurs
- My Visit to the Zoo
- New Year's Day
- Nice New Neighbors (illustrated by Aliki, written by Franz Brandenberg)
- No School Today (illustrated by Aliki, written by Franz Brandenberg)
- Oh Lord, I Wish I Was a Buzzard (illustrated by Aliki, written by Polly Greenberg)
- One Little Spoonful
- Overnight at Mary Bloom's
- Push Button
- Quiet in the Garden
- Six New Students (illustrated by Aliki, written by Franz Brandenberg)
- Tabby
- The Eggs
- The Gods and Goddesses of Olympus
- The Horse That Liked Sandwiches (illustrated by Aliki, written by Vivian Thompson)
- The King's Day (Louis XIV biography)
- The Listening Walk (illustrated by Aliki, written by Paul Showers)
- The Long Lost Coelacanth and other Living Fossils
- The Many Lives of Benjamin Franklin
- The Story of Johnny Appleseed
- The Story of William Penn
- The Story of William Tell
- The Twelve Months (illustrated by Aliki, written by Franz Brandenberg)
- The Two of Them
- This is the House Where Jack Lives, 1962 (written by Joan Heilbroner)
- Those Summers
- Three Gold Pieces: A Greek Folk Tale
- Use Your Head, Dear
- We Are Best Friends
- Welcome, Little Baby
- What Can You Make of It? (illustrated by Aliki, written by Franz Brandenberg)
- What's For Lunch, Charley? (illustrated by Aliki, written by Margaret Hodges)
- What's Wrong with a Van? (illustrated by Aliki, written by Franz Brandenberg)
- Wild and Woolly Mammoths
- William Shakespeare and the Globe
