= My Shadow (poem) =

1885 poem by Robert Louis Stevenson

- by Robert Louis Stevenson
- Country: Great Britain
- Language: English
- Subject(s): Shadows
- Publication date: 1885

My Shadow is an 1885 poem by Robert Louis Stevenson. Among his most famous poems for children, it appeared in A Child's Garden of Verses in 1885.

It is written in iambic heptameter containing seven metrical feet per line.

== Reception ==
On publication, the poem did not find favour with a reviewer in British Quarterly Review, who preferred The Hayloft, Farewell to the Farm, and The North-West Passage. By the twentieth century, however, it had become sufficiently popular to be included in the syllabus of several elementary school in the United States, including 1918, 1916, and 1921. In 1948, the U.S. President Harry S. Truman used the lines, "I have a little shadow / That goes in and out with me; / And what can be the use of him / Is more than I can see" to refer to a Republican candidate "running along behind him."
