= Salignac =

Salignac may refer to:

== People ==
- Bertrand de Salignac de la Mothe-Fénelon (1523–1589), French ambassador to England
- Eugene de Salignac (1861–1943), American photographer
- Eustase Thomas-Salignac, French tenor
- François de Salignac de la Mothe-Fénelon (missionary) (1641–1679), Sulpician missionary in New France
- François Louis de Salignac marquis de La Mothe-Fénelon (1722–1767), French soldier, governor of Martinique from 1763 to 1764
- Giraut de Salignac, jongleur and troubadour from the Quercy
- Mélanie de Salignac (1744–1766), blind French woman whose achievements were mentioned in the accounts of Diderot

== Places ==
- Salignac, Alpes-de-Haute-Provence, a commune in the Alpes-de-Haute-Provence department of France
- Salignac, Gironde, in the Gironde department
- Salignac-de-Mirambeau, in the Charente-Maritime department
- Salignac-Eyvigues, in the Dordogne department
  - Château de Salignac
- Salignac-sur-Charente, in the Charente-Maritime department
