= Fénelon (disambiguation) =

François Fénelon (1651-1715) was Archbishop of Cambrai, a French writer and theologian.

Fénelon may also refer to:

== People ==
- Bertrand de Salignac de la Mothe-Fénelon (1523–1589), French diplomat
- Fania Fénelon (1922–1983), French pianist, composer, and cabaret singer
- François de Salignac de la Mothe-Fénelon (missionary) (1641–1679), missionary in New France
- François Fénelon (1651–1715), French archbishop and writer
- François-Louis de Salignac de La Mothe-Fénelon (1722–1767), French soldier, governor of Martinique from 1763 to 1764.
- Gabard Fénélon (born 1981), Haitian footballer
- Gabriel-Jacques de Salignac de La Motte, marquis de Fénelon (1688–1746), French military commander and diplomat
- Maurice Fenelon (1834–1897), Irish-born educator, merchant and political figure in Newfoundland
- Philippe Fénelon (born 1952), French composer

== Other uses ==
- Lycée Fénelon, Paris, a secondary school in the Quartier Latin
- Château de Fénelon, a château in Dordogne, France
- Fenelon, Nevada, a ghost town
- Fenelon Falls, a town in Ontario, Canada

== See also ==
- Shamir Fenelon (b. 1994), English footballer
