= Ever After =

1998 American romantic drama film by Andy Tennant

- Theatrical release poster
- Directed by: Andy Tennant
- Screenplay by: Susannah Grant; Andy Tennant; Rick Parks
- Produced by: Mireille Soria; Tracey Trench
- Starring: Drew Barrymore; Anjelica Huston; Dougray Scott; Jeanne Moreau
- Cinematography: Andrew Dunn
- Edited by: Roger Bondelli
- Music by: George Fenton
- Production companies: Fox Family Films (uncredited); Mireille Soria Production
- Distributed by: 20th Century Fox
- Release date: July 31, 1998
- Running time: 120 minutes
- Country: United States
- Language: English
- Budget: $25–26 million
- Box office: $98 million

Ever After (known in promotional material as Ever After: A Cinderella Story) is a 1998 American romantic period drama film directed by Andy Tennant from his own screenplay, co-written by Susannah Grant and Rick Parks. Co-produced by Fox Family Films and Mireille Soria Production, the film is inspired by Charles Perrault's 1697 fairy tale Cinderella and stars Drew Barrymore and Anjelica Huston, with Dougray Scott and Jeanne Moreau in supporting roles.

The film removes the pantomime and supernatural elements commonly found in retellings of the Cinderella tale and instead treats the story as historical fiction, setting it in Renaissance-era France.

Ever After was released by 20th Century Fox in theaters on July 31, 1998, to positive reviews from critics. It was a box-office success, grossing $98 million.

== Plot ==
The Brothers Grimm meet the Grande Dame who expresses her disappointment in their version of Cinderella. She produces her ancestor's portrait and glass slipper as the main reason why she invited them before recounting the true story that partially inspired the tale.

During the French Renaissance, ten years after Auguste de Barbarac dies, his daughter, Danielle has been forced to become a servant to her step-mother, the Baroness Rodmilla de Ghent and her step-sisters, Marguerite and Jacqueline. Initially mistaking him for a thief, Danielle has an unexpected confrontation, with Henry, the Crown Prince, as he is attempting to flee in order to avoid an arranged marriage to Princess Gabriella of Spain. Henry gives Danielle 20 francs to keep their interlude secret. He is eventually caught by the Royal Guard after stopping gypsies from robbing Leonardo da Vinci, whom King Francis has invited to the Royal court.

Danielle disguises herself as a noblewoman and uses Henry's bribe to go to the palace to buy back Maurice after Rodmilla plans to ship him to the Americas. Henry witnesses her arguing with the jailer and impressed by Danielle's passion and intelligence, orders the jailer to release Maurice. When he asks for her name, Danielle gives her late mother's name, Countess Nicole de Lancret. Francis agrees to hold a masquerade ball at which Henry will announce his engagement to the woman of his choosing at midnight or else Francis will announce his marriage to Gabriella. Rodmilla accelerates her efforts at getting Henry to notice Marguerite, while being neglectful to Jacqueline. Meanwhile, Danielle begins secretly spending time with Henry. After an outing at the library of the Franciscan monks, a gang of gypsies ambushes them, but they offer to help them when Danielle bids the leader and attempts to carry Henry away. At the gypsy camp, they share their first kiss.

Rodmilla and Marguerite plan to steal Nicole's wedding gown and glass slippers for Marguerite to wear at the ball. When Marguerite insults Nicole, Danielle attacks and chases her. Marguerite retaliates by burning the copy of Utopia that Auguste had given to Danielle. Jacqueline shows sympathy towards Danielle and criticizes Marguerite for her cruelty.

Queen Marie holds a luncheon with Marguerite and Rodmilla, during which the two deduce that Danielle is Countess de Lancret. Danielle meets Henry, who reveals that she has inspired him to build a university. Unable to reveal the truth about her identity, she flees. Rodmilla confronts Danielle about her deception and locks her in the pantry when she does not reveal the whereabouts of the slippers and dress. Gustave does Maurice a favor by going to the ball to recruit Leonardo to help Danielle escape. Leonardo, Gustave, Paulette and Louise prepare Danielle in Nicole's attire which Louise kept hidden prior. Danielle arrives determined to tell Henry the truth, but Rodmilla exposes her. Furious, Henry rejects Danielle, causing her to tearfully flee. Leonardo, whom Danielle briefly encountered, leaves Henry with her lost slipper after repproaching him for his callousness.

Henry agrees to marry Gabriella. During the ceremony, realizing that she also loves someone else who is in attendance, he calls off the wedding and seeks out Danielle until Maurice and Jacqueline inform him that Rodmilla sold her to Pierre Le Pieu following the ball. Henry and Laurent set off to rescue Danielle, only to find that she has freed herself. Henry professes his love for her, and proposes marriage by fitting the slipper onto her foot. Danielle happily accepts.

The Royal court summons Rodmilla, Marguerite, and Jacqueline. As punishment for lying to Marie about Danielle's engagement, Rodmilla is stripped of her title and threatened with exile to the Americas alongside Marguerite, unless someone speaks for her. Danielle appears and instead asks that Rodmilla be shown the same "courtesy" she had shown her. Rodmilla and Marguerite are reduced to servants in the palace laundry.

Danielle and Henry built a university until it was destroyed during the French Revolution except for Danielle's portrait Leonardo painted. The Grande Dame emphasizes that while her great-great-grandparents did live happily ever after, the point is that they lived.

== Cast ==
- Drew Barrymore as Danielle de Barbarac, the only child of Nicole de Lancret and Auguste de Barbarac. Barrymore described her character as a "tough Cinderella. She dives into bees' hives for the wax, takes pigs out truffle-hunting, swims in the river, quotes Sir Thomas More's Utopia. She even nails the prince with an apple for stealing her horse. She does many things a man does, whether it involves physical strength or reading. She's ahead of her time in breaking down the barriers between a woman's place in society and a man's place."
  - Anna Maguire as Young Danielle
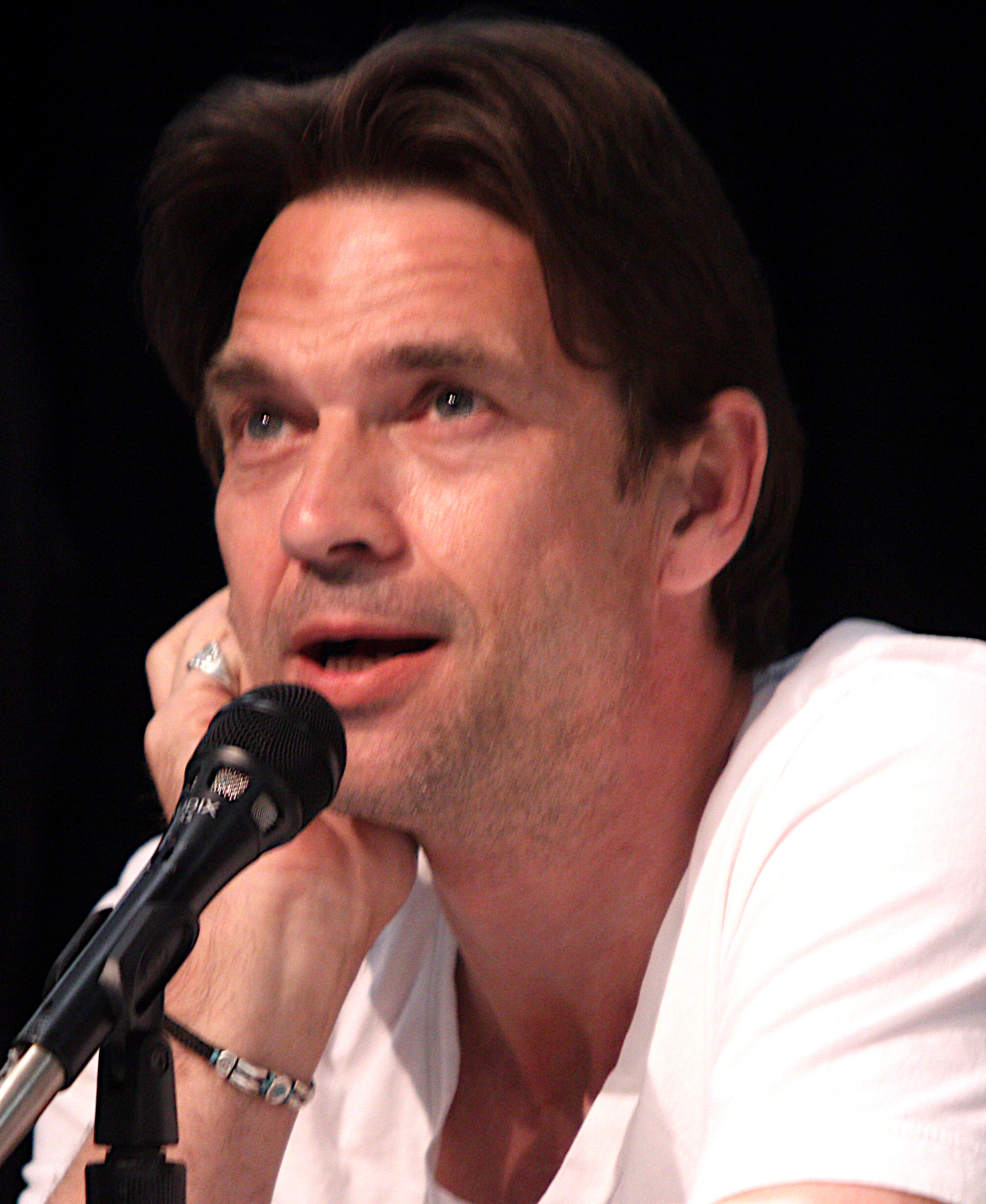
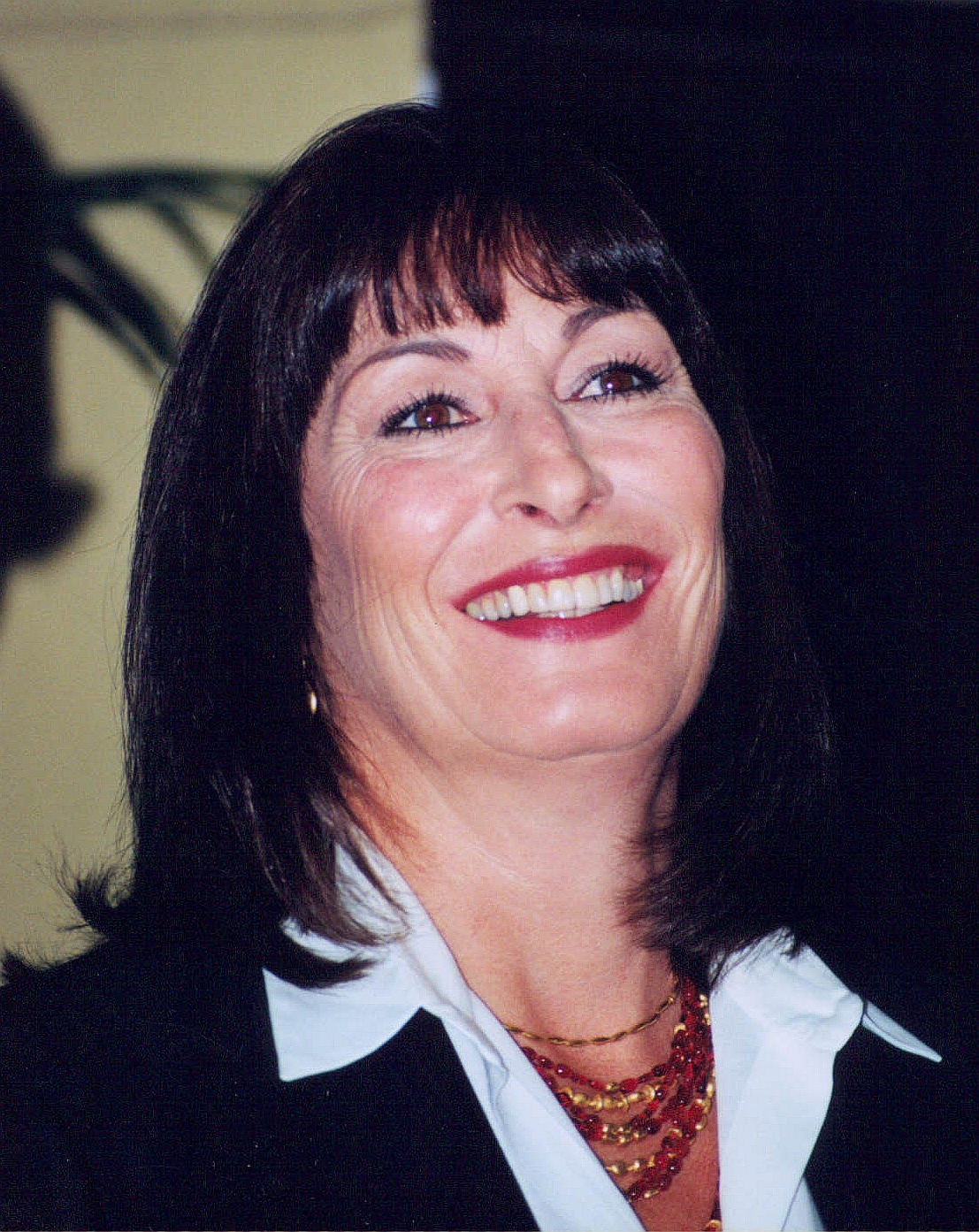
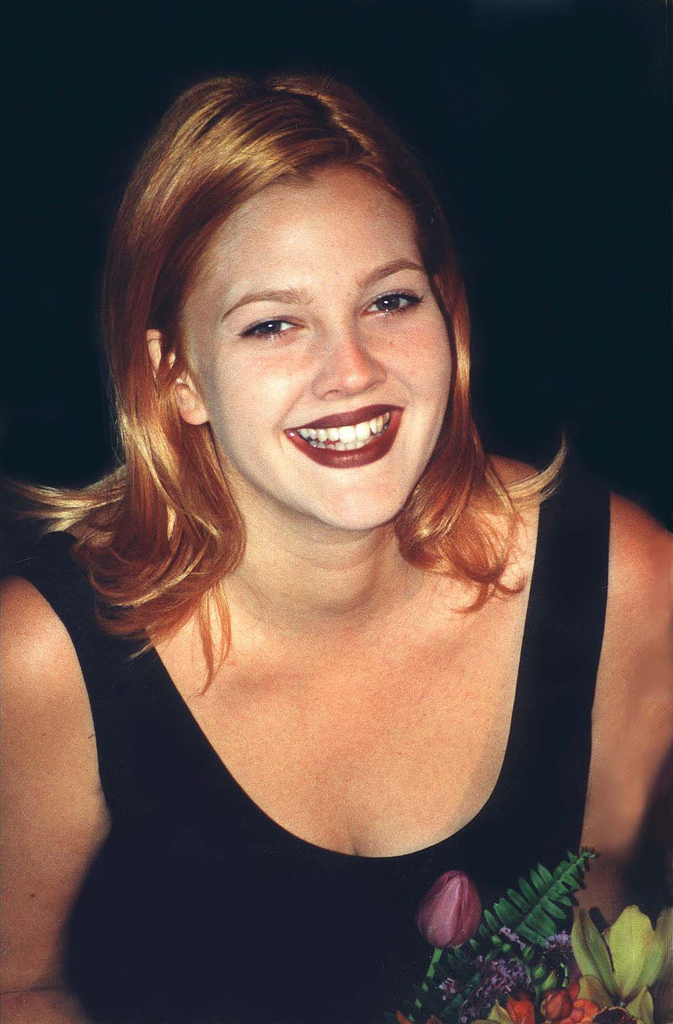
Barrymore, Huston, and Scott
portray the lead roles
- Anjelica Huston as Baroness Rodmilla de Ghent, Danielle's cruel stepmother
- Dougray Scott as Henry, Crown Prince of France, Danielle's love interest and son of Marie and Francis
- Patrick Godfrey as Leonardo da Vinci, an artist, inventor and a member of the royal court
- Timothy West as Francis, King of France and Henry's father
- Judy Parfitt as Marie, Queen of France and Henry's mother
- Jeroen Krabbé as Auguste de Barbarac, Danielle's father
- Melanie Lynskey as Jacqueline de Ghent, Danielle's "nice" stepsister
  - Alex Pooley as Young Jacqueline
- Megan Dodds as Marguerite de Ghent, Danielle's "evil" stepsister
  - Elizabeth Earl as Young Marguerite
- Richard O'Brien as Monsieur Pierre Le Pieu, a lecherous merchant
- Jeanne Moreau as Grande Dame, Danielle and Henry's great-great-granddaughter
- Lee Ingleby as Gustave, Danielle's childhood friend and an apprentice painter
  - Ricki Cuttell as Young Gustave
- Kate Lansbury as Paulette, a servant to the de Barbaracs
- Matyelok Gibbs as Louise, Maurice's wife and a servant to the de Barbaracs
- Walter Sparrow as Maurice, Louise's husband and a servant to the de Barbaracs
- Peter Gunn as Laurent, Captain of the Royal Guard
- Joerg Stadler as Wilhelm Grimm, author and Jacob's brother
- Andrew Henderson as Jacob Grimm, author and Wilhem's brother
- Toby Jones as a Royal Page
- Amanda Walker as an Old Noblewoman

== Production ==
Ever After was filmed in Super 35.

Jenny Beavan designed the costumes, with Clare Spragge serving as costume supervisor. Naomi Cricher created the wings of Danielle's masque gown, which were constructed from piano wire and silk tulle.

=== Casting ===
Bill Mechanic recommended Scott for the role of Henry, who won the part over actors Matt Damon and Leonardo DiCaprio.

=== Historical context ===
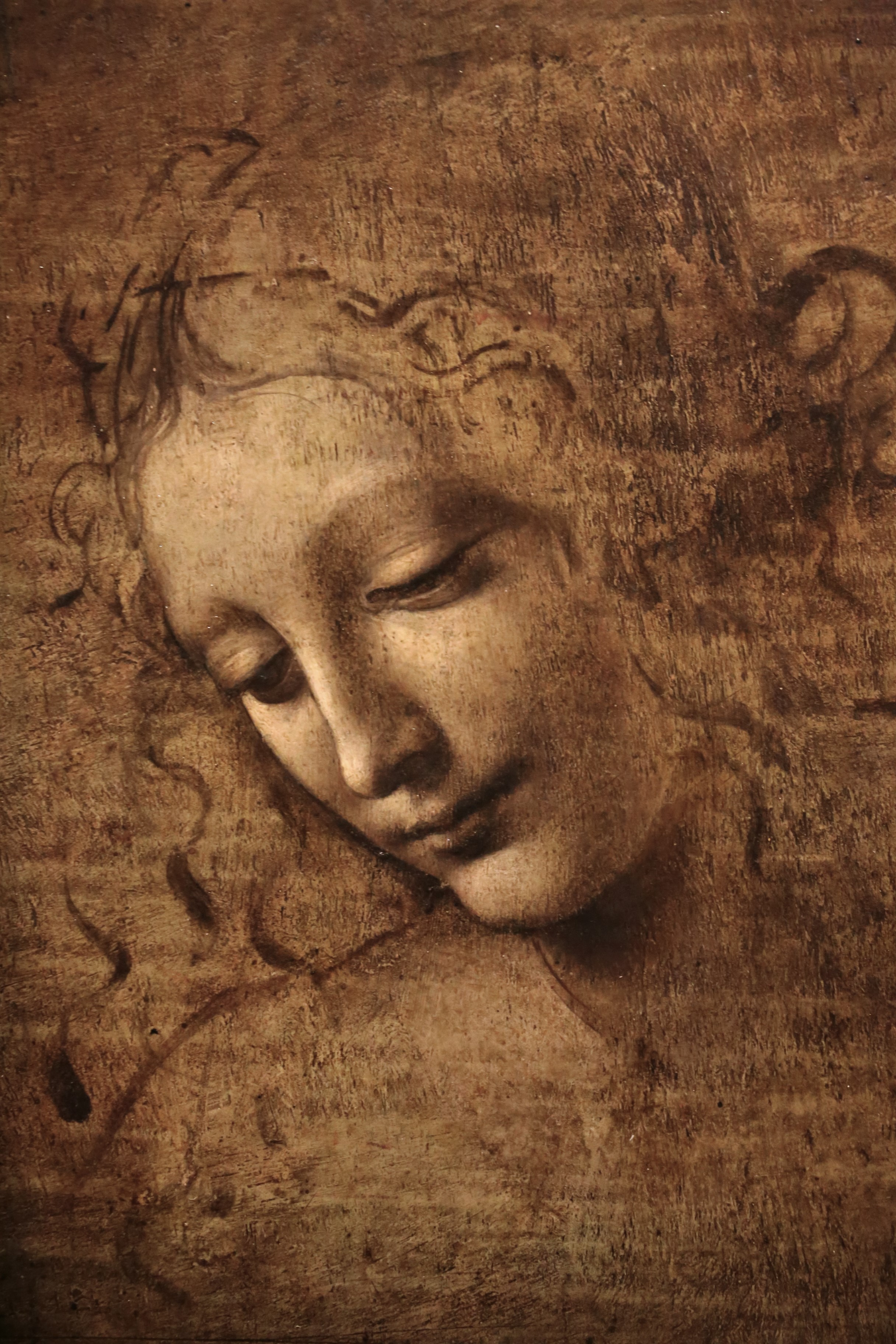
Leonardo da Vinci's painting La Scapigliata is depicted in the film as a portrait of Danielle.

While the story is fictional, it involves several historical figures, places and events. The film is set in France during the 16th and 19th centuries and features Leonardo da Vinci and the Brothers Grimm, as well as allusions to the explorer Jacques Cartier, the author and philosopher Thomas More, the fairy tale author Charles Perrault, the French colonies in the New World, and the French Revolution.

Though the main portion of the film takes place in early 1500s France, the royals shown are most likely not meant to be the historical figures for which they are named. King Francis I summoned Leonardo da Vinci to his court around 1516, three years before King Henry II was born; neither of King Francis I's wives was named Marie (the first was named Claude and the second Eleanor). King Henry II was married to Catherine de' Medici at the age of 14.

=== Locations and sets ===
The castle shown in the film is the Château de Hautefort in the Dordogne region of France. Other featured châteaux are de Fénelon, de Losse, de Lanquais, de Beynac and the Château de la Roussie, that served as the house of the de Barbaracs, as well as the city of Sarlat-la-Canéda. The painting of Danielle is based on da Vinci's La Scapigliata. Another da Vinci painting, Mona Lisa, is also featured in the film.

== Release ==
=== Home media ===
On March 2, 1999, the film was released on VHS & DVD.

On April 11, 2003, the film was released on DVD with the movie Never Been Kissed—another film starring Drew Barrymore—in a combo pack. On May 26, 2006, the film was released in The Drew Barrymore Collection Celebrity Pack, which also contained DVDs of Never Been Kissed and Fever Pitch. On March 2, 2010, the film was released in a DVD combo pack with the movie An Affair to Remember—a double feature celebrating 20th Century Fox's 75th anniversary; two months later, the film was then released in a DVD combo pack on May 4, 2010, with the movies Anna and the King and Australia—a triple feature celebrating the same thing.

On January 4, 2011, the film was released on Blu-ray. On September 4, 2012, it was released with the movie Never Been Kissed in a combo pack on Blu-ray. On October 7, 2014, the film was released in a 4 Drew Barrymore Favorites DVD set with Never Been Kissed, Fever Pitch, and Whip It.

On January 6, 2015, the film was released in a Blu-ray / Digital HD combo pack, region-free. The film was also released on Blu-ray in the UK on August 6, 2018. Then, on January 1, 2019, the film was again released in a Blu-ray / Digital HD combo pack but for Region A.

== Reception ==
=== Critical response ===
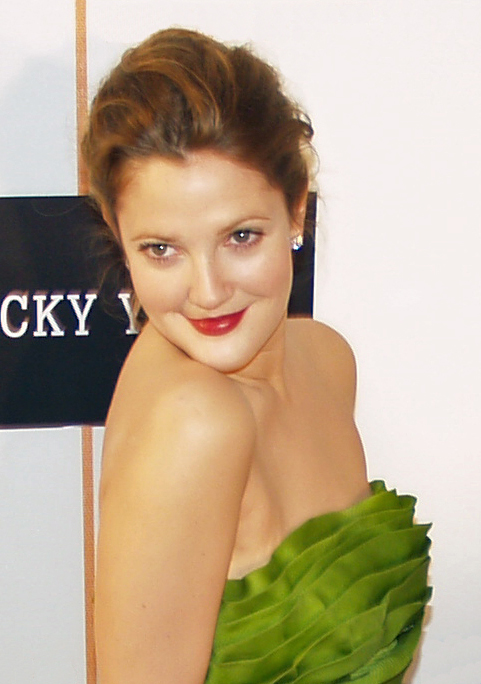
Drew Barrymore was repeatedly acclaimed by critics for her performance.

Ever After received positive reviews from critics. The review aggregator website Rotten Tomatoes reported that the film had a 91% approval rating based on 65 reviews, with an average rating of 7.6/10. According to its consensus, "Ever After is a sweet, frothy twist on the ancient fable, led by a solid turn from star Barrymore." On Metacritic, the film has a weighted average score of 66 out of 100 based on 22 critics, indicating "generally favorable reviews". Audiences polled by CinemaScore gave the film an "A" grade on a scale of A+ to F.

Roger Ebert from Chicago Sun-Times awarded the film three out of four stars and wrote: "I went to the screening expecting some sort of soppy children's picture and found myself in a costume romance with some of the same energy and zest as The Mask of Zorro." He particularly praised the cinematography, costume design, and Drew Barrymore's acting. In his review for San Francisco Chronicle, Mick LaSalle called Ever After "the best Cinderella movie ever," complimenting both the character writing and the performances of Barrymore, Anjelica Huston, and Dougray Scott. Leonard Klady of Variety gave a positive review, stating that the film "successfully maintains the story's period trappings while introducing a heroine with modern resonance… One can quibble only about a languorous style and a tendency to overplay the villainy of the stepmother and her eldest daughter. But these are small glitches in an otherwise first-rate effort." Robin Grant wrote for The Lantern that although Ever After "is worth seeing just for the scenery, the updated storyline and good acting make it an excellent movie for young and old alike."

In her review for The Austin Chronicle, Marjorie Baumgarten gave the film three out of five stars, stating that Ever After "turns out to be a potent and imaginative retelling that proves Cinderella's timelessness defies carbon-dating." Lisa Schwarzbaum from Entertainment Weekly awarded the film a "B−" and described it as "unwieldy, uneven, but nevertheless unexpectedly witty, girl-positive production," while praising the character writing, costume design, and performances by Barrymore, Huston, and Judy Parfitt. Ian Nathan of Empire gave the film three out of five stars, complimenting the cinematography and acting of Huston and Scott, but criticizing the script and Barrymore's performance, which he found unconvincing and "far from her best."

A Time Out reviewer wrote that Barrymore "manages just fine in carrying this Cinderella update… Given that this is adolescent romance, never straying far from traditional stereotypes, its 'progressive' feel-good aura is mainly down to Barrymore, whose limitations are only exposed in big love scenes." Kenneth Turan of Los Angeles Times highlighted Barrymore and Huston's performances, but was displeased with the script and the "inconsistent" tone of the film, concluding that "though it has its moments, Ever After never completely finds its footing, either in its century or our own." In his review for The New York Times, Stephen Holden called the film a "bland, sappy costume comedy," criticizing its script and George Fenton's musical score; however, he praised Barrymore's "buoyant, unaffected" acting, which he considered the best thing about the film.

=== Accolades ===
Ever After was nominated for the Best Romance Trailer in the first annual Golden Trailer Awards.

The cast was nominated for the Best Sci-Fi / Fantasy / Horror Ensemble award from the Online Film & Television Association, with Barrymore, Dodds, and Houston individually picking up nominations for their performances. Mirelle Soria and Tracey Trench received a nomination for Best Sci-Fi / Fantasy / Horror Picture, with George Fenton tying with Mike Oldfield and Mark Snow's score for The X-Files: Fight the Future for the award for Best Original Sci-Fi / Fantasy / Horror Score.

Barrymore was also nominated for Best Actress at the Chlotrudis Awards. Huston won the first Chloe Award for her career achievements, with a specific mention of Ever After. Beavan was nominated for Best Costume Design at the 3rd Golden Satellite Awards.

At the 25th Saturn Awards, Barrymore won for Best Actress and Beavan won for Best Costume Design, while Huston was nominated for Best Supporting Actress and Fenton was nominated for Best Music. Fenton also received a nomination from the International Film Music Critics Association for Film Composer of the Year.

At the 1999 Teen Choice Awards, Ever After received a nomination for Choice Drama Movie, with Barrymore receiving a nomination for Choice Movie Actress – Sci-Fi/Fantasy.

Awards and nominations
Award	Category	Recipient(s)	Result	Ref.
Blockbuster Entertainment Awards	Favorite Actress – Drama/Romance	Drew Barrymore	Won	
Blockbuster Entertainment Awards	Favorite Actor – Newcomer	Dougray Scott	Nominated	
Blockbuster Entertainment Awards	Favorite Supporting Actress – Drama/Romance	Anjelica Huston	Won	
Chlotrudis Awards	Best Actress	Drew Barrymore	Nominated	
Golden Trailer Awards	Best Romance Trailer	Ever After	Nominated	
International Film Music Critics Association Awards	Film Composer of the Year	George Fenton	Nominated	
Kids' Choice Awards	Favorite Movie Actress (also for The Wedding Singer)	Drew Barrymore	Won	
Online Film & Television Association Awards	Best Breakthrough Performance: Female	Megan Dodds	Nominated	
Online Film & Television Association Awards	Best Sci-Fi/Fantasy/Horror Picture	Mireille Soria; Tracey Trench	Nominated	
Online Film & Television Association Awards	Best Sci-Fi/Fantasy/Horror Actress	Drew Barrymore; Anjelica Huston	Nominated	
Online Film & Television Association Awards	Best Sci-Fi/Fantasy/Horror Ensemble	Ever After	Nominated	
Online Film & Television Association Awards	Best Music, Original Sci-Fi/Fantasy/Horror Score	George Fenton	Tie with The X-Files: Fight the Future	
Satellite Awards	Best Costume Design	Jenny Beavan	Nominated	
Saturn Awards	Best Actress	Drew Barrymore	Won	
Saturn Awards	Best Supporting Actress	Anjelica Huston	Nominated	
Saturn Awards	Best Costumes	Jenny Beavan	Won	
Saturn Awards	Best Music	George Fenton	Nominated	
Teen Choice Awards	Choice Drama Movie	Ever After	Nominated	
Teen Choice Awards	Choice Movie Actress – Sci-Fi/Fantasy	Drew Barrymore	Nominated	
Teen Choice Awards	Choice Movie Sleazebag	Anjelica Huston	Nominated	
Teen Choice Awards	Choice Movie Breakout	Dougray Scott	Nominated	

== Musical adaptation ==
A report in 2012 indicated that a musical theatre production was in the works, with the book and lyrics by Marcy Heisler and music by Zina Goldrich. The musical was originally scheduled for its world premiere in April 2009 at the Curran Theatre in San Francisco, but the pre-Broadway run was postponed. In May 2012, the project was back on track with Kathleen Marshall signing on to direct a Broadway run.

A workshop of the musical was held from April 25, 2013 – May 15, 2013 with Sierra Boggess as Danielle, Jeremy Jordan as Prince Henry, and Ashley Spencer as Marguerite. The musical made its world premiere at the Paper Mill Playhouse from May 21, 2015 – June 21, 2015. Christine Ebersole played the role of Baroness Rodmilla de Ghent. Alongside Ebersole, Margo Seibert starred as Danielle, James Snyder as Henry, Charles Shaughnessy as King Francis, and Tony Sheldon as Leonardo da Vinci. Another production of the musical played at Atlanta's Alliance Theatre from January 15, 2019, to February 19. The production was directed by Susan V. Booth and starred Sierra Boggess as Danielle de Barbarac, Terry Burrell as Queen Marie, Todd Buonopane as Captain Laurent, David Garrison as Leonardo da Vinci, Chris Kayser as King Francis, Jeff McCarthy as Pierre Malette, Tim Rogan as Prince Henry and Rachel York as Baroness Rodmilla de Ghent.

== See also ==
- Cultural references to Leonardo da Vinci
