= Gabriel-Jacques de Salignac de La Motte, marquis de Fénelon =

French military commander (1688–1746)

Gabriel-Jacques de Salignac de La Motte (25 July 1688 – 2 October 1746) styled vicomte de Saint-Julien later marquis de Fénelon, was an 18th-century French military commander and diplomat.

A career soldier, his military appointments included Captain in the Royal-Cuirassiers from 1706, Colonel of the Regiment of Poitou and Brigadier-General from 1719, Maréchal de camp in 1734, Governor of Le Quesnoy from 1735, before promotion to Lieutenant-General of the French Army in 1738.

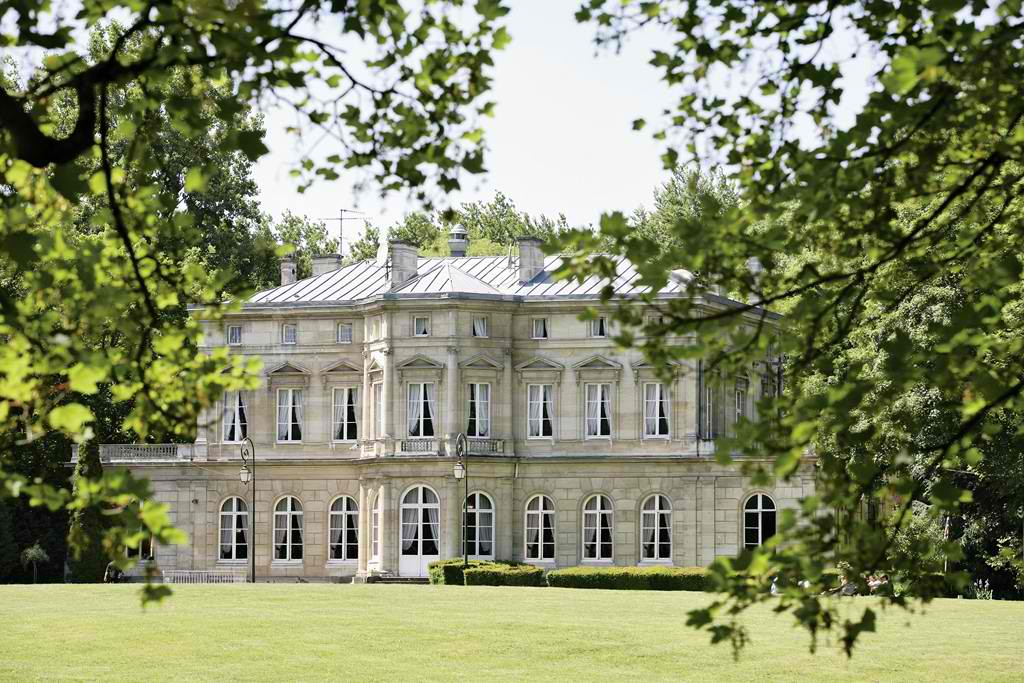
Château de La Motte-Fénelon

Vicomte de Saint-Julien also served Louis XV as Ambassador to the Netherlands at The Hague from 1724, before being posted to London in 1741.

== Family ==
Descended from an aristocratic family of churchmen, courtiers and soldiers, he was accorded the courtesy title of Vicomte de Saint-Julien. Upon the death of his father François de Salignac in 1742, he succeeded in the family titles as Marquis de Fénelon et de Salignac, comte de La Motte, baron de Loubert, seigneur de Mareuil, de Boisse & de Péricard, etc.

He married, on 24 December 1721, Françoise-Louise, daughter of Louis-Urbain le Peletier, marquis de Rosanbo; they had seven children, including François-Louis de Salignac, who as eldest son succeeded him in the marquessate upon his death in 1746. His wife, Françoise-Louise marquise de Fénelon, died in 1782.

Collar of the Saint-Esprit

== Honours ==
- Conseiller d'Etat
- Chevalier du Saint-Esprit
- Chevalier de Malte

== See also ==
- Archbishop François Fénelon
- Château de Fénelon
- Château de La Motte-Fénelon
- Château de Salignac
- Fénelon
