= Tracey Trench =

American film producer

Tracey Trench is an American film producer. A Harvard University cum laude graduate in anthropology and a UCLA Anderson School of Management MBA, she has worked for the Hong Kong Trade Development Council, Creative Artists Agency, and Oriental DreamWorks.

Trench grew up in Terre Haute, Indiana, the daughter of two school teachers.

Trench is the winner of the 1999 Alfred I. duPont–Columbia University Award with writer director Laura Angélica Simón for the documentary Fear and Learning at Hoover Elementary. She and Simón also were nominated for the Grand Jury Prize and won the Freedom of Expression Award at the Sundance Film Festival. That year, Trench (with Simón) was also nominated for an Emmy Award.

== Filmography ==
- Fear and Learning at Hoover Elementary, (1997)
- Ever After, (1998)
- I'll Be Home for Christmas, (1998)
- Head over Heels, (2001)
- See Spot Run, (2001)
- Corky Romano, (2001)
- Frank McKlusky, C.I., (2002)
- Just Married, (2003)
- Chasing Papi, (2003)
- Herbie: Fully Loaded, (2005)
- Rebound, (2005)
- Yours, Mine & Ours, (2005)
- The Pink Panther, (2006)
- The Headhuntress, (2011)
