= Val de Virvée =

- Commune
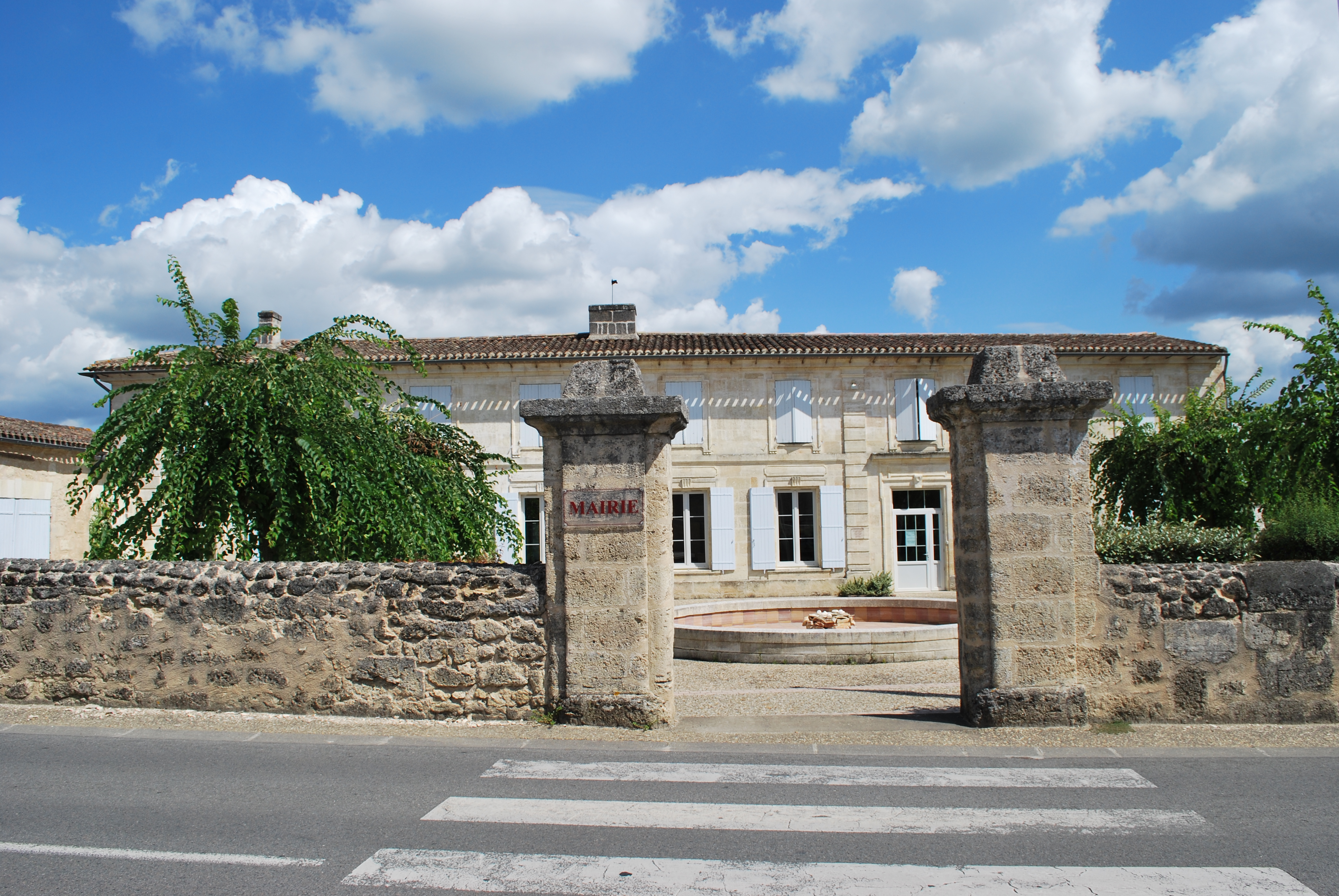
- The town hall in Aubie-et-Espessas
- Location of Val de Virvée
- Location within France Location within Nouvelle-Aquitaine
- Coordinates: 45°01′08″N 0°24′22″W
- Country: France
- Region: Nouvelle-Aquitaine
- Department: Gironde
- Arrondissement: Blaye
- Canton: Le Nord-Gironde
- Intercommunality: CC Grand Cubzaguais

Government
  - Mayor (2020–2026): Christophe Martial
- Area^{1}: 20.77 km^{2} (8.02 sq mi)
- Population (2023): 3,793
  - Density: 182.6/km^{2} (473.0/sq mi)
- Time zone: UTC+01:00 (CET)
  - Summer (DST): UTC+02:00 (CEST)
- INSEE/Postal code: 33018 /33240
- ^{1} French Land Register data, which excludes lakes, ponds, glaciers > 1 km^{2} (0.386 sq mi or 247 acres) and river estuaries.

Val de Virvée (French pronunciation: [val də viʁve]; Occitan: Vallée de Virvée) is a commune in the Gironde department of southwestern France. The municipality was established on 1 January 2016 and consists of the former communes of Aubie-et-Espessas, Saint-Antoine and Salignac.

== Population ==
Population data refers to the commune in its geography as of January 2025.

Historical population
Year	Pop.	±% p.a.
1968	1,519	—
1975	1,571	+0.48%
1982	2,183	+4.81%
1990	2,424	+1.32%
1999	2,369	−0.25%
2007	2,812	+2.17%
2012	3,229	+2.80%
2017	3,512	+1.69%
2023	3,793	+1.29%
Source: INSEE

== See also ==
- Communes of the Gironde department
