= Aubie-et-Espessas =

- Part of Val de Virvée
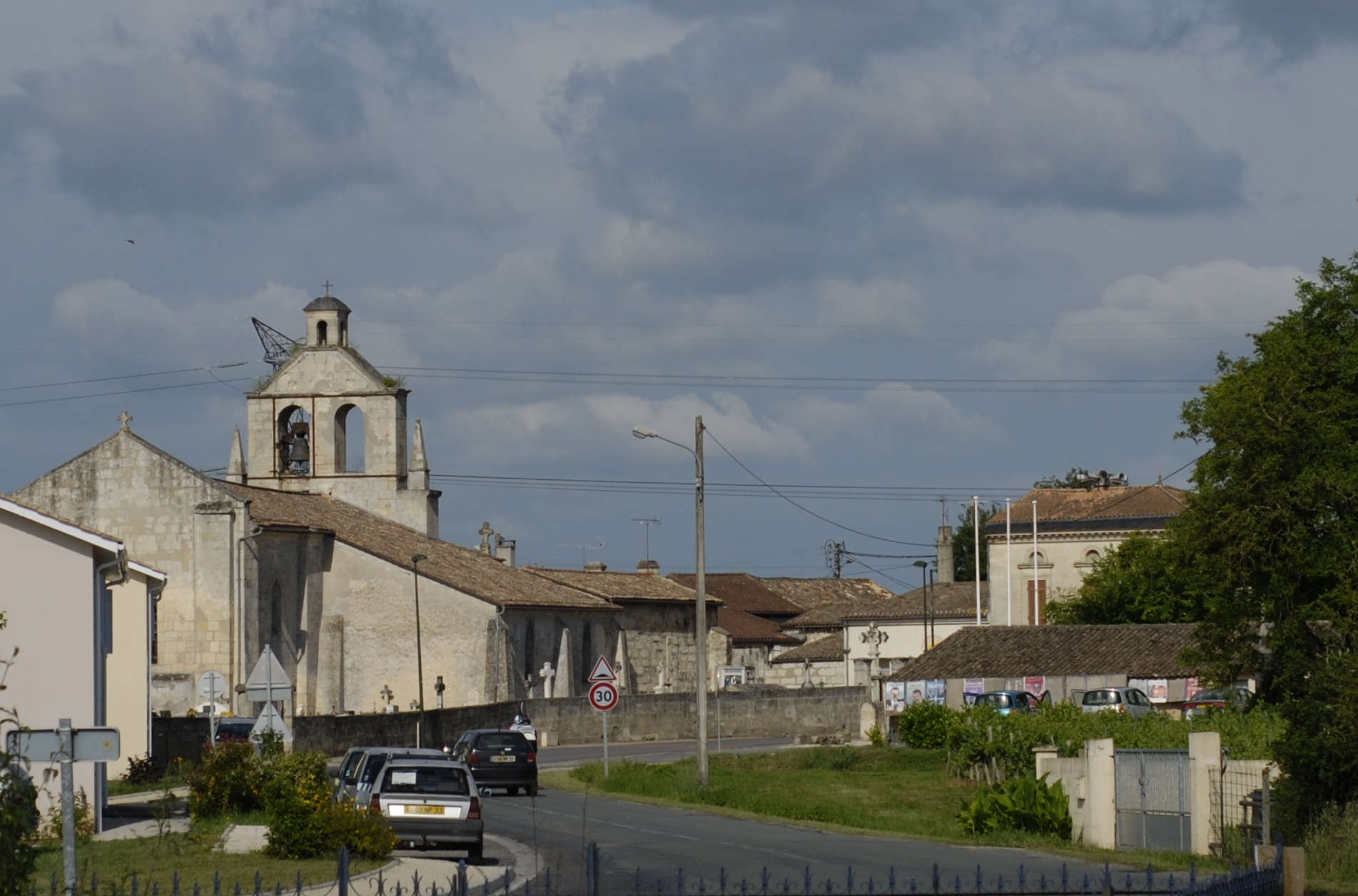
- Location of Aubie-et-Espessas
- Location within France Location within Nouvelle-Aquitaine
- Coordinates: 45°01′12″N 0°24′20″W
- Country: France
- Region: Nouvelle-Aquitaine
- Department: Gironde
- Arrondissement: Blaye
- Canton: Le Nord-Gironde
- Commune: Val de Virvée
- Area^{1}: 7.55 km^{2} (2.92 sq mi)
- Elevation: 47 m (154 ft)
- Highest elevation: 56 m (184 ft)
- Lowest elevation: 14 m (46 ft)
- Population (2022): 1,386
  - Density: 184/km^{2} (475/sq mi)
- Time zone: UTC+01:00 (CET)
  - Summer (DST): UTC+02:00 (CEST)
- Postal code: 33240
- ^{1} French Land Register data, which excludes lakes, ponds, glaciers > 1 km^{2} (0.386 sq mi or 247 acres) and river estuaries.

Aubie-et-Espessas (French pronunciation: [obi e ɛspesas]; Gascon: Aubia e Espessàs) is a former commune in the Gironde department in southwestern France. On 1 January 2016, it was merged into the new commune Val de Virvée.

== Population ==
Historical population
Year	Pop.	±% p.a.
1962	555	—
1968	602	+1.36%
1975	675	+1.65%
1982	901	+4.21%
1990	940	+0.53%
1999	950	+0.12%
2006	1,033	+1.20%
2022	1,386	+1.85%
Source: EHESS and INSEE

== See also ==
- Communes of the Gironde department
