= Sainte-Mondane =

- Commune
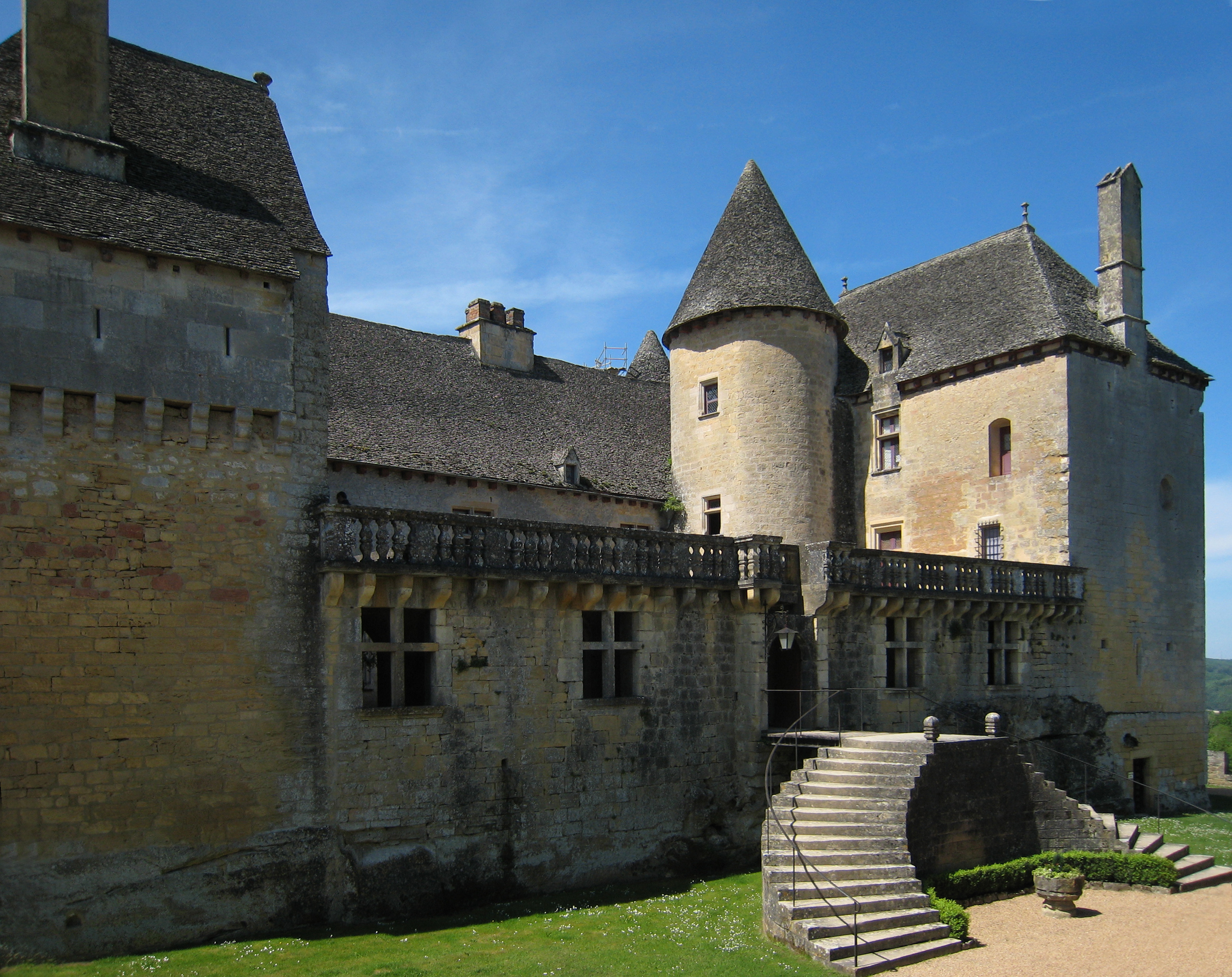
- Château de Fénelon
- Location of Sainte-Mondane
- Location within France Location within Nouvelle-Aquitaine
- Coordinates: 44°50′47″N 1°20′15″E
- Country: France
- Region: Nouvelle-Aquitaine
- Department: Dordogne
- Arrondissement: Sarlat-la-Canéda
- Canton: Terrasson-Lavilledieu

Government
  - Mayor (2020–2026): Gilles Arpaillange
- Area^{1}: 9.63 km^{2} (3.72 sq mi)
- Elevation: 140 m (460 ft)
- Highest elevation: 235 m (771 ft)
- Lowest elevation: 60 m (200 ft)
- Population (2023): 305
  - Density: 31.7/km^{2} (82.0/sq mi)
- Time zone: UTC+01:00 (CET)
  - Summer (DST): UTC+02:00 (CEST)
- INSEE/Postal code: 24470 /24370
- ^{1} French Land Register data, which excludes lakes, ponds, glaciers > 1 km^{2} (0.386 sq mi or 247 acres) and river estuaries.

Sainte-Mondane (French pronunciation: [sɛ̃t mɔ̃dan]; Occitan: Senta Mundana) is a commune in the Dordogne department in Nouvelle-Aquitaine in southwestern France.

== Population ==
Historical population
Year	Pop.	±% p.a.
1968	262	—
1975	240	−1.25%
1982	223	−1.04%
1990	212	−0.63%
1999	199	−0.70%
2007	227	+1.66%
2012	270	+3.53%
2017	260	−0.75%
2023	305	+2.70%
Source: INSEE

== Personalities ==
- François Fénelon (1651–1715), theologian

== See also ==
- Communes of the Dordogne department
