= Frenchman's Bay =

Coordinates: 43°49′03″N 79°05′33″W

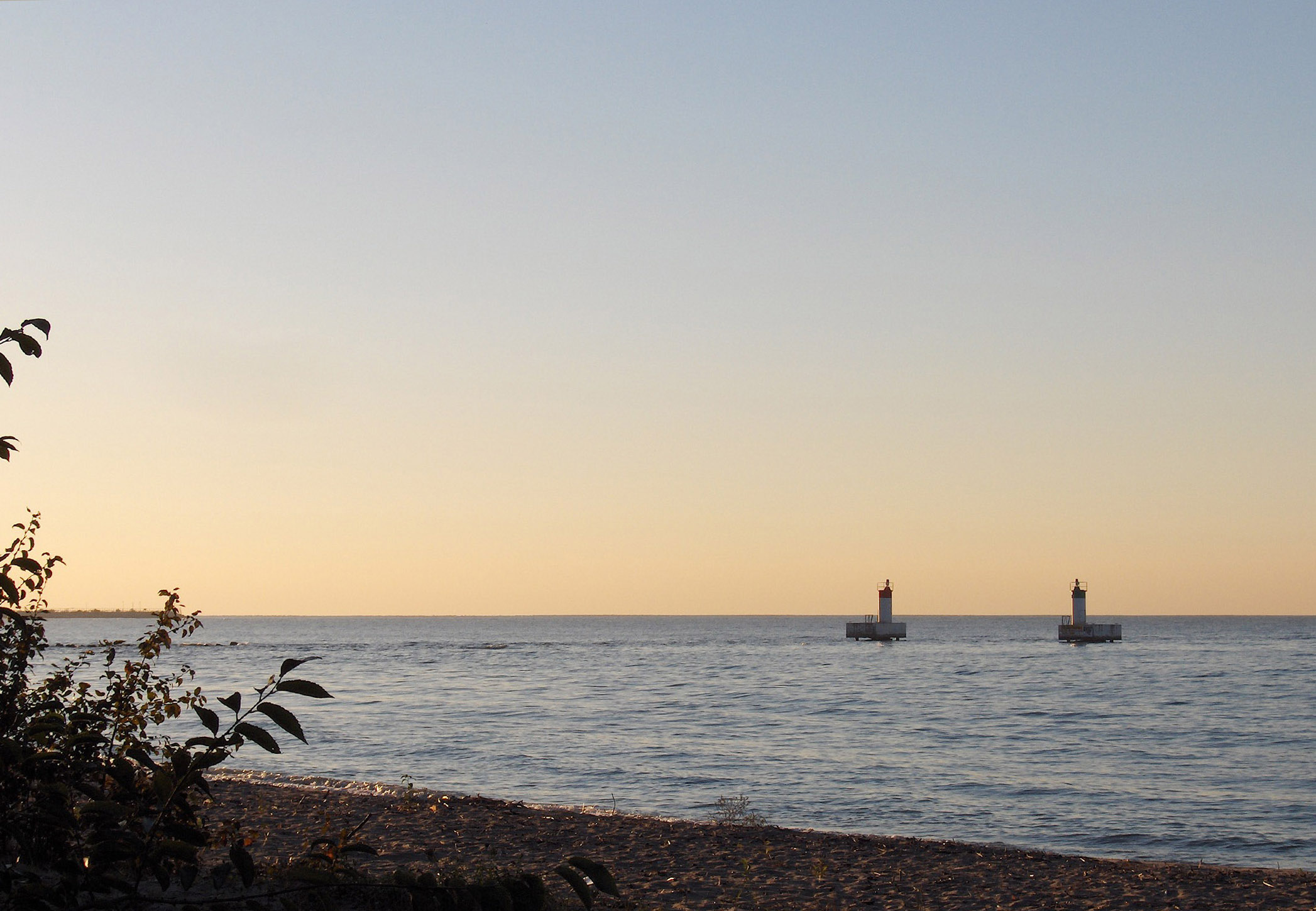
Frenchman's Bay in Pickering

Frenchman's Bay is a body of water in Pickering, Ontario, Canada, believed to be named for François de Salignac de la Mothe-Fénelon.

The bay was once land locked before a canal was dug into the sandbar to allow vessels to serve what was then referred to as Port Liverpool in 1843.

== History ==
The bay was likely not visited by the namesake French missionary who is believed to have visited the mouth of the Rouge River further west in 1669.

The area around the Frenchman's Bay was settled in 1837 with saw mill opened by Tripp family. Grain mills were later opened with wharf located on the north end.

In 1853 Pickering Harbour Company was incorporated and continues to control water lots on the east side today. Icehouses were operated by Lake Simcoe Ice from 1914 to the 1930s. Today the east end is home to Frenchmans Bay Marina, residential homes (including newer townhouses along Liverpool Road). Slightly east of the bay is Pickering Nuclear Generating Station, while west side is home to Pickering Bay Yacht Club, Frenchman's Bay Canoe Club.

== Today ==
The residential neighborhoods of Bay Ridges and West Shore surround the bay, but the houses along the bay are part of Fairport.

The bay itself and the nature preserve both fall under the authority of the Toronto and Region Conservation Authority.

A number of city parks are found around the bay:

- Beachfront Park
- Bruce Hanscombe Memorial Park
- Douglas Park
- Glen Ravine Park
- Millennium Park
- Progress Frenchman's Bay East Park
- Rotary Frenchman's Bay West Park
- Vistula Ravine

== Watershed ==
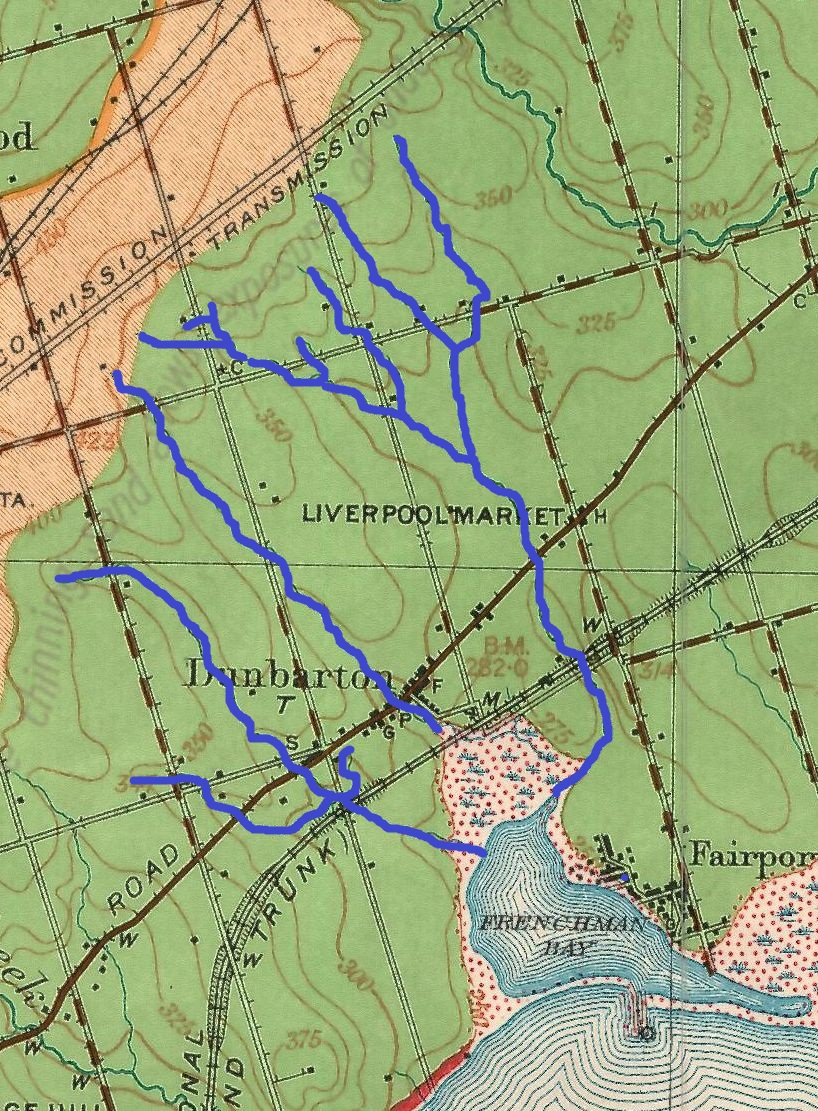
Creeks feeding Frenchman's Bay

Besides water flowing in from Lake Ontario via the channel the bay is fed by a few creeks emptying into it:

- Amberlea Creek (flows above ground at Vistula Creek Park)
- Dunbarton Creek
- Krosno Creek
- Pine Creek

The north end of the bay is a marsh.
