= Saint-Antoine, Gironde =

Saint-Antoine
- Part of Val de Virvée
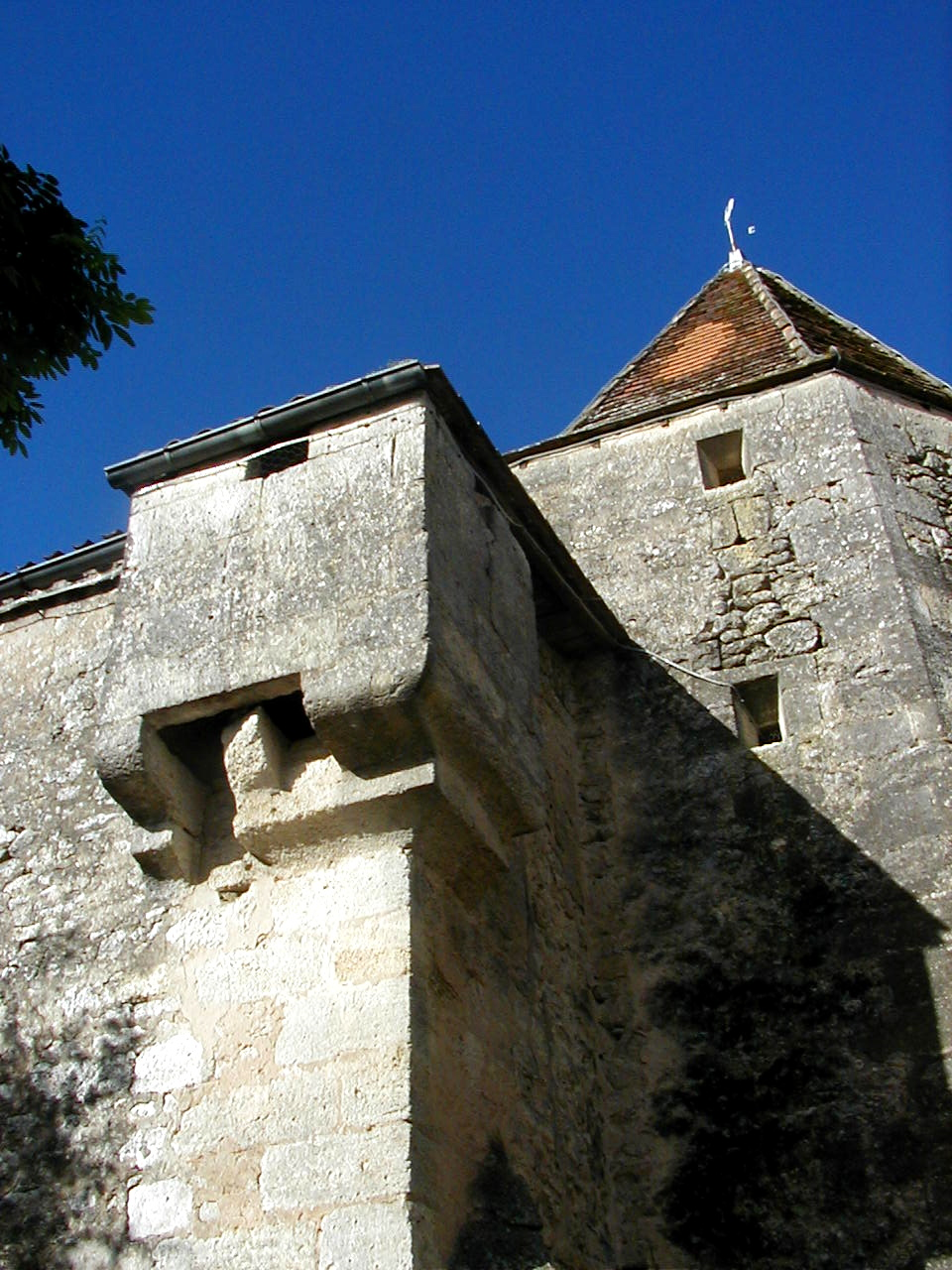
- Location of Saint-Antoine
- Location within France Location within Nouvelle-Aquitaine
- Coordinates: 45°01′01″N 0°25′18″W
- Country: France
- Region: Nouvelle-Aquitaine
- Department: Gironde
- Arrondissement: Blaye
- Canton: Le Nord-Gironde
- Commune: Val de Virvée
- Area^{1}: 0.18 km^{2} (0.069 sq mi)
- Elevation: 41 m (135 ft)
- Highest elevation: 47 m (154 ft)
- Lowest elevation: 36 m (118 ft)
- Population (2023): 373
  - Density: 2,100/km^{2} (5,400/sq mi)
- Time zone: UTC+01:00 (CET)
  - Summer (DST): UTC+02:00 (CEST)
- Postal code: 33240
- ^{1} French Land Register data, which excludes lakes, ponds, glaciers > 1 km^{2} (0.386 sq mi or 247 acres) and river estuaries.

Saint-Antoine (French pronunciation: [sɛ̃.t‿ɑ̃twan]; Occitan: Sent Antòni) is a former commune in the Gironde department in Aquitaine in southwestern France. On 1 January 2016 it was merged into the new commune Val de Virvée.

== See also ==
- Communes of the Gironde department
