= François de Salignac de la Mothe-Fénelon (missionary) =

François de Salignac de la Mothe Fénelon (1641–1679) was a Sulpician missionary in New France. He was ten years older than his half-brother, François Fénelon, Archbishop of Cambrai.

Little is known of François in his early years beyond his birth in Château de Fénelon in Périgord until he left for the missions of New France in 1667 as yet not an ordained priest. Bishop Laval took care of this matter, ordaining him in June, 1668. He and M. Claude Trouvé left almost immediately to establish a mission for the Iroquois, at their request, near the Bay of Quinte on Lake Ontario. (A letter by Trouvé is appended to François Dollier de Casson's Histoire du Montréal and gives a good summary of the Kenté (Quinté) mission). Fénelon spent the winter of 1669–1670 at Ganatsekwyagon, an Iroquoian village at the mouth of the Rouge River and resulted in the nearby Frenchman's Bay being named for him.

In 1672 he was recalled from Kenté to establish an Algonquin mission on the outskirts of Ville-Marie at a place called Gentilly. Disputes with Governor Frontenac led to his returning to France in 1675, where he resigned from the Sulpicians. Fénelon died in 1679 at the age of thirty-eight.

A waterfall on the Trent-Severn Waterway between Cameron and Sturgeon lakes is named after Fenelon. The town of Fenelon Falls in the city of Kawartha Lakes takes its name from the falls.
