= Salignac-de-Mirambeau =

- Commune
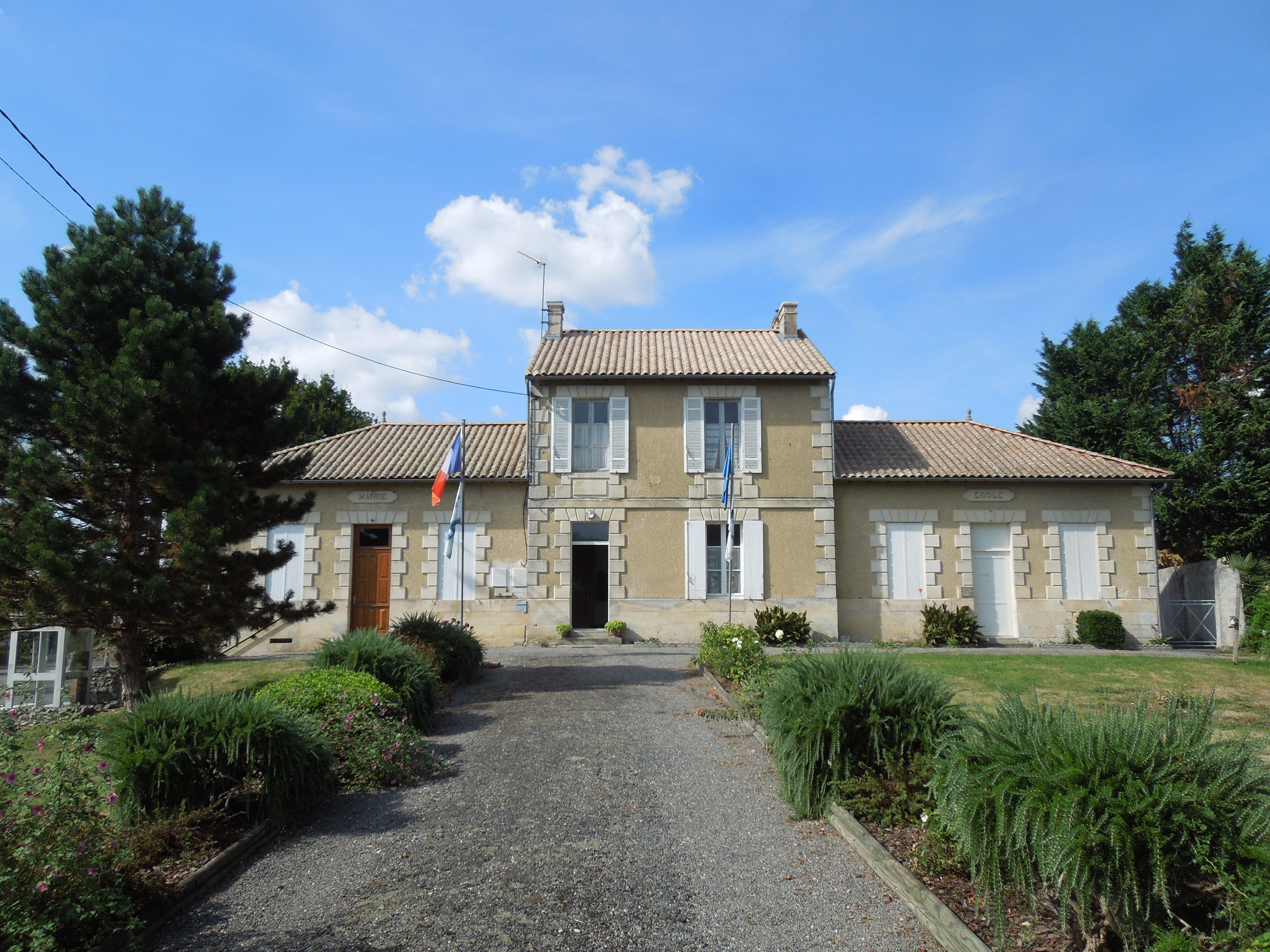
- The town hall in Salignac-de-Mirambeau
- Location of Salignac-de-Mirambeau
- Location within France Location within Nouvelle-Aquitaine
- Coordinates: 45°20′46″N 0°28′54″W
- Country: France
- Region: Nouvelle-Aquitaine
- Department: Charente-Maritime
- Arrondissement: Jonzac
- Canton: Pons

Government
  - Mayor (2020–2026): Benoît Meugniot
- Area^{1}: 7.56 km^{2} (2.92 sq mi)
- Highest elevation: 111 m (364 ft)
- Lowest elevation: 37 m (121 ft)
- Population (2023): 163
  - Density: 21.6/km^{2} (55.8/sq mi)
- Time zone: UTC+01:00 (CET)
  - Summer (DST): UTC+02:00 (CEST)
- INSEE/Postal code: 17417 /17130
- ^{1} French Land Register data, which excludes lakes, ponds, glaciers > 1 km^{2} (0.386 sq mi or 247 acres) and river estuaries.

Salignac-de-Mirambeau (French pronunciation: [saliɲak də miʁɑ̃bo], before 1962: Salignac) is a commune in the department in the Nouvelle-Aquitaine region in southwestern France.

== Population ==
Historical population
Year	Pop.	±% p.a.
1968	223	—
1975	197	−1.76%
1982	179	−1.36%
1990	179	+0.00%
1999	154	−1.66%
2007	149	−0.41%
2012	162	+1.69%
2017	164	+0.25%
2023	163	−0.10%
Source: INSEE

== See also ==
- Communes of the Charente-Maritime department
