= Château de Lanquais =

French château

Coordinates: 44°49′07″N 0°40′26″E

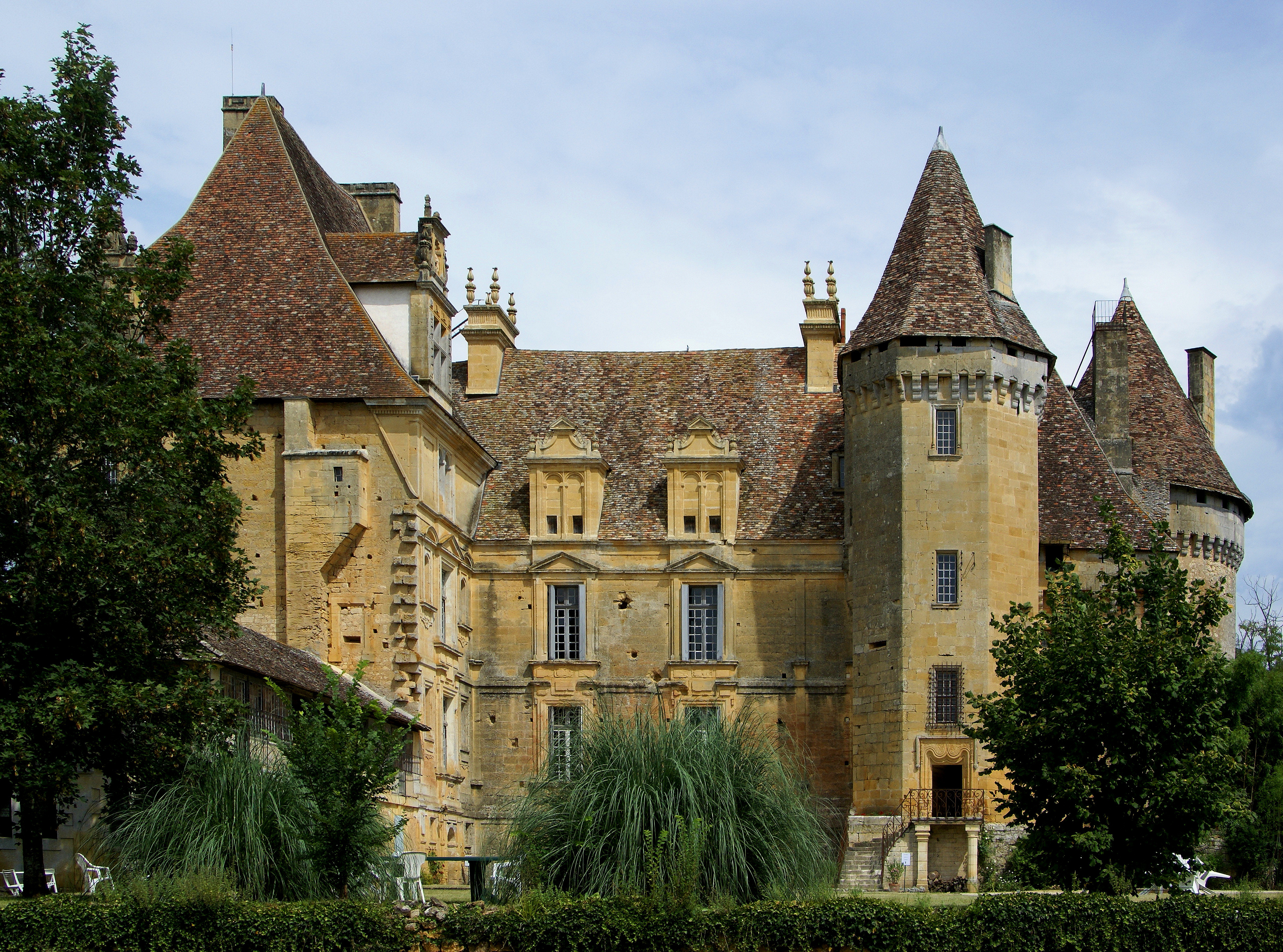

Château de Lanquais is a château in Lanquais, Dordogne, Nouvelle-Aquitaine, France.
