= Laura Angélica Simón =

Laura Angélica Simón is a Mexican American writer and director.

Her first film was the documentary Fear and Learning at Hoover Elementary. It won the "Freedom of Expression Award" and was nominated for the Grand Jury Prize at the Sundance Film Festival and the Alfred I. duPont-Columbia University Award.
