= Fenelon, Nevada =

Ghost town in Elko County, NV, US

Coordinates: 41°12′08″N 114°39′47″W

Fenelon is an extinct town in Elko County, in the U.S. state of Nevada. The GNIS classifies it as a populated place.

== History ==
The name "Fenelon" was assigned by railroad officials. A variant name was "Otego". Fenelon had ten inhabitants in 1941.
