= La Scapigliata =

Painting by Leonardo da Vinci

- The Lady with Dishevelled Hair (English)
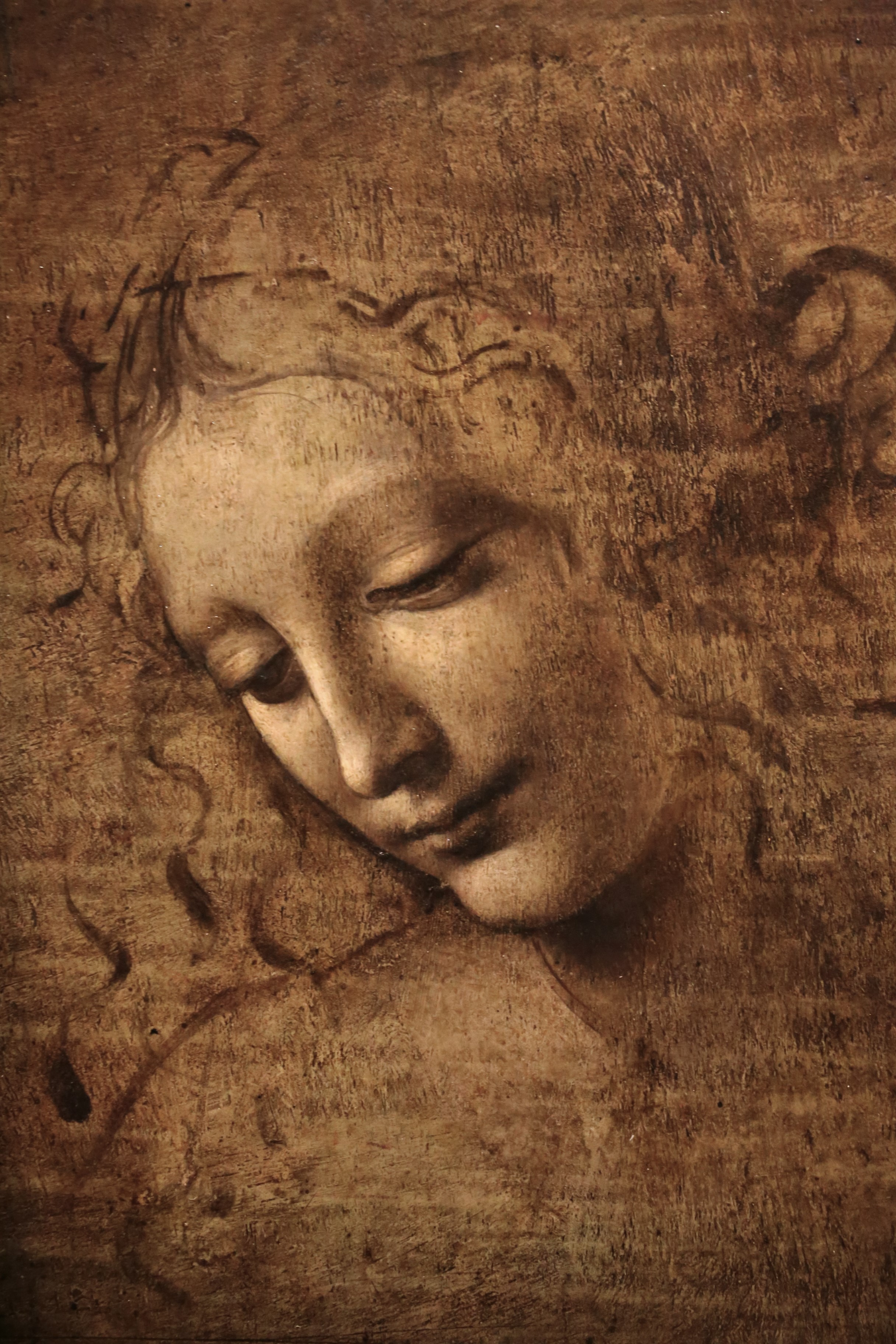
- Artist: Leonardo da Vinci
- Year: c. 1506–1508 (unfinished)
- Medium: Oil, umber, and white lead pigments on poplar wood panel
- Dimensions: 24.7 cm × 21 cm (9.7 in × 8.3 in)
- Location: Galleria Nazionale; Parma

La Scapigliata (Italian for 'The Lady with Dishevelled Hair') (Note: pronounced [la skapiʎˈʎaːta]; sometimes spelled Scapiliata; known by various names.) is an unfinished painting generally attributed to the Italian High Renaissance artist Leonardo da Vinci, and dated c. 1506–1508. Painted in oil, umber, and white lead pigments on a small poplar wood panel, its attribution remains controversial, with several experts attributing the work to a pupil of Leonardo. The painting has been admired for its captivating beauty, mysterious demeanor, and mastery of sfumato.

There is no real consensus on the subject, date, history, or purpose of the painting. It shows an unidentified woman gazing downward while her hair fills the frame behind her. Many theories regarding the subject have been proposed: that it is a sketch for an uncompleted painting of Saint Anne; a study for the London version of the Virgin of the Rocks or Leonardo's lost painting of Leda and the Swan; or a painting left deliberately unfinished for its aesthetic value.

The painting was recorded in the sale in 1826 of Gaetano Callani's collection to the Galleria Nazionale di Parma, the museum in which it is currently housed, but proof of its existence may date back to 1531, when it may have been owned by Isabella d'Este. Although many studies of Leonardo's oeuvre are silent on the issue, most scholars who discuss the painting regard it as an autographic work by Leonardo da Vinci and it has been listed as such in various major Leonardo exhibitions.

== Name ==
The painting has no formal name but is best known by the nickname La Scapigliata (Italian for 'The Lady with Dishevelled Hair') in reference to the tousled and waving hair of the subject. It has been known by various other names in combination with La Scapigliata, including Head of a Woman, Head of a Young Woman, Head of a Young Girl, Head and Shoulders of a Woman, Portrait of a Maiden, and Female Head.

== Description ==
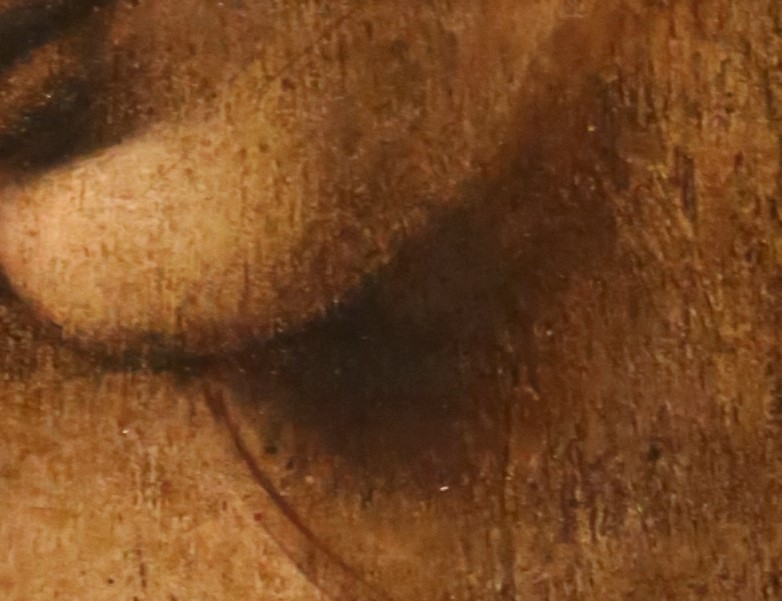
Detail of sfumato in La Scapigliata

The true intention for the work's creation is unknown, and it has been variously referred to as a sketch, a drawing, or a painting. Due to the use of paint, it is correctly described as a painting, but scholars continue to discuss its sketch- and drawing-like qualities, often linking it to Leonardo's early works such as the Adoration of the Magi and Saint Jerome in the Wilderness, as well as later ones such as The Virgin and Child with Saint Anne and Saint John the Baptist. The art historian Carmen Bambach suggests that it should be described as a "brush drawing", or as a "painted sketch".

The painting is executed on a small (Note: Out of all paintings attributed to Leonardo, La Scapigliata is the smallest) 24.6 cm × 21.0 cm (9.7 in × 8.3 in) poplar wood panel with oil, umber, and white lead pigments. It portrays the unfinished outline of a young woman whose face gently gazes downward while her loosely drawn, dishevelled hair waves in the air behind her. The woman's eyes are half-closed and completely ignore the outside world and viewer, while her mouth is slightly shaped into an ambiguous smile, evocative of the Mona Lisa. Other than her face that takes up most of the painting, the rest of the painting is barely even sketched in, with a primed, but unpainted, background. The differences in the face and the rest of the painting are effectively blended by a mastery of sfumato. The art historian Alexander Nagel notes that the sfumato results in the shadows concealing any strokes or marks, and points out how the shadows are softened by careful lighting around them, such as on the left side of the jaw. The appeal in this contrast of the unfinished and finished parts has provoked speculation that the painting is not incomplete, but was left in a sketchy state on purpose.

The subject of the painting is unknown and no theory has proved convincing enough for modern scholars to reach a consensus about it. One theory is that the work is a study for Leonardo's lost painting of Leda and the Swan, but this is discredited by existing copies of the painting showing Leda with hair more elaborate than that of the woman in La Scapigliata. It is also claimed that the painting was a sketch for a painting of Saint Anne that never was completed, or a study for the London version of the Virgin of the Rocks. According to scholars at the Galleria Nazionale di Parma, the subject of the painting may be a portrait of an anonymous woman.

== Attribution ==
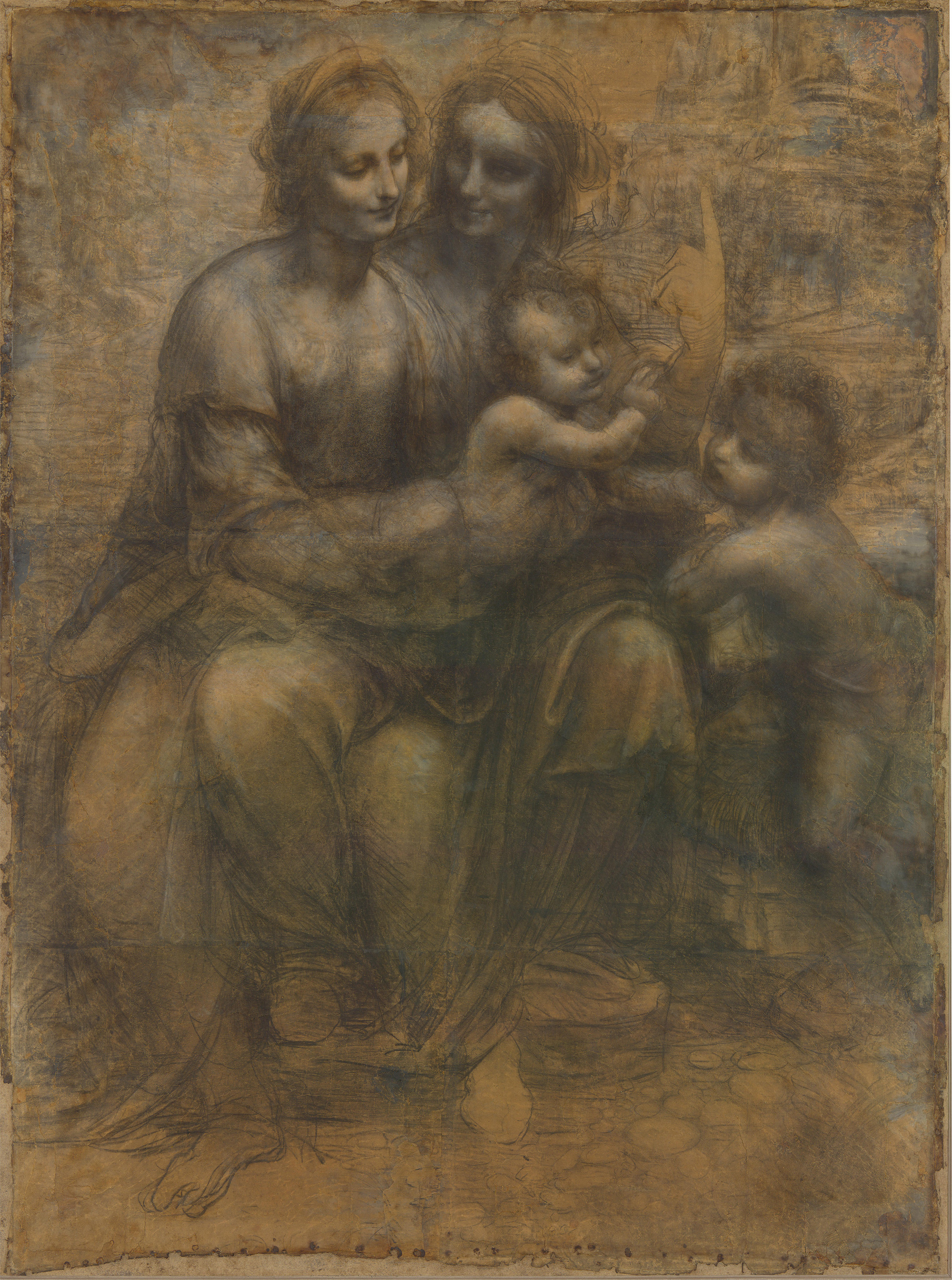
La Scapigliata is thought to have been made around the same time as Leonardo's cartoon The Virgin and Child with Saint Anne and Saint John the Baptist.

It is generally agreed by modern scholars that La Scapigliata is by Leonardo da Vinci. The attribution is not so widely accepted as other debated Leonardo paintings, such as his Ginevra de' Benci, Portrait of a Musician, Lady with an Ermine, and Saint John the Baptist and is ignored by some art historians, with many refraining from even commenting on it. The art historians Martin Kemp and Frank Zöllner omit the work from their catalogues of Leonardo's paintings, while Luke Syson proposes that it is the work of one of Leonardo's many pupils.

Doubts concerning the attribution of the painting are not recent. In 1896 Corrado Ricci, director of the Galleria Nazionale, claimed that it had been forged by its former owner, Gaetano Callani, which caused it to be re-attributed as "by the school of Leonardo". In 1924 this claim was challenged by the art historian Adolfo Venturi, who asserted that it was by Leonardo, and who revealed evidence that sought to link the work with the House of Gonzaga. The attribution to Leonardo was further advocated by Carlo Pedretti, who connected the painting to Isabella d'Este, a known patron of Leonardo. Most scholars have since accepted the work to be an autographic Leonardo, but modern critics such as the art historian Jacques Franck continue to question its authenticity. Franck, basing his doubts on the irregular proportions and strangely shaped skull of the subject, has proposed the painting to be by Leonardo's pupil Giovanni Boltraffio. He has cited the similarity between La Scapigliata and Boltraffio's work Heads of the Virgin and Child. Bernardino Luini, another pupil of Leonardo, has also been suggested as the artist, the evidence being based on his depictions of female faces.

Major exhibitions at the Louvre (2003), Milan (2014–2015), New York (2016), Paris (2016), Naples (2018), and again at the Louvre (2019–2020), have all displayed the painting as being by Leonardo.

== Dating ==
The painted is usually dated c. 1506–1508 based on stylistic similarities to other works by Leonardo, namely the Virgin and Child with Saint Anne and Saint John the Baptist and the London Virgin of the Rocks. In 2016, Bambach dated the painting to c. 1500–1505, since she believes that Leonardo was commissioned by Agostino Vespucci at this time.

== History ==
No records of a commission survive for the painting, but its intimacy suggests that it may have been for a private patron. Bambach cites a note by the Florentine official Agostino Vespucci that mentions Leonardo, and describes the appeal and beauty of the unfinished bust of Venus by the famous ancient Greek painter Apelles. She believes that La Scapigliata may be the result of Vespucci commissioning Leonardo to execute a work along the same lines.

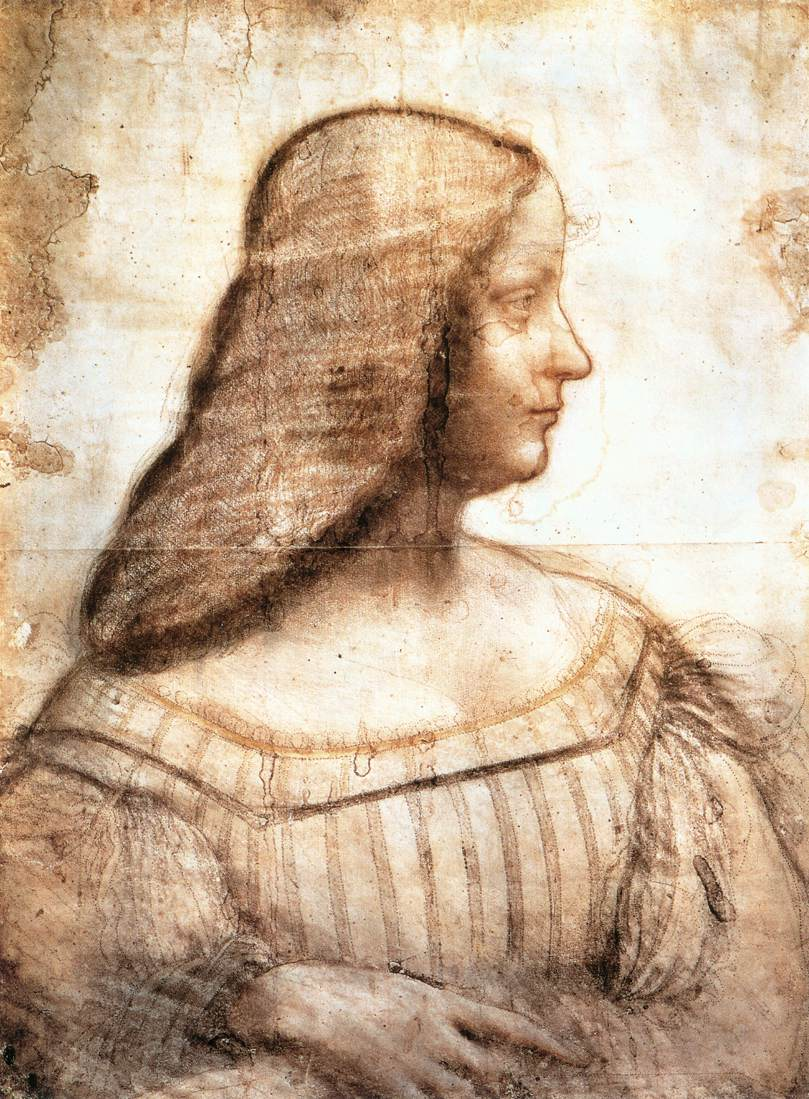
Portrait of Isabella d'Este by Leonardo da Vinci (1499–1500) depicts the Marchioness of Mantua, the proposed patron of La Scapigliata.

A more widely accepted theory is that the work was commissioned by a known patron of Leonardo and a member of the Gonzaga family of Mantua, Isabella d'Este. She was one of the leading women of the Italian Renaissance, a major cultural and political figure, who had asked Leonardo for a painting of the Madonna for her private studio in 1501. Isabella d'Este probably gave the painting to her son Federico II on the occasion of his wedding to Margaret Paleologa. This is evidenced by a 1531 letter from the secretary of the Mantuan Gonzaga family, Ippolito Calandra, who suggests that a painting (with very similar features as La Scapigliata) be hung in the bedroom of Federico II and Margaret Paleologa. A 1531 inventory of the Gonzaga family art collection in the ducal palace also records a painting that could be La Scapigliata. Another inventory from 1627 likely refers to La Scapigliata and is likely to be the origin of the nickname for the painting since the record describes it as follows: "A painting depicts the head of a dishevelled woman... by Leonardo da Vinci." This record implies that it was not sold among a large sale of paintings from the Gonzaga collection to Charles I of England in 1626–1627. It is possible that the painting was stolen from the Gonzaga collection in July 1630 when, under the pay of Ferdinand II, an imperial army of 36,000 Landsknecht mercenaries sacked Mantua.

The next (and first certain) record of the painting is in 1826, when Francesco Callani offered the collection of his father, the Parmesan artist Gaetano Callani, for sale to the gallery of the Accademia di Belle Arti di Parma. In a list of the works in the collection for the gallery's director, Paolo Toschi, La Scapigliata appears listed as "A head of Madonna painted in chiaroscuro". The sale implies that it entered the collection of Gaetano Callani at some point, probably during his 1773–1778 stay in Milan, but other than being in Milan, there is no information on the whereabouts of the painting prior to that notation. The sale took place in 1839, but the painting identified as La Scapigliata entered the Palatine Gallery of Parma (now the Galleria Nazionale di Parma), where it was listed as "The head of Leonardo da Vinci" and described by Toschi as "a very rare work to find today". It has been housed in the National Gallery of Parma ever since.

== Interpretation ==
"Here Leonardo does not simply create an icon of female beauty but much more. With a unique experimentalism of its kind, it manages to summarize the divine complexity of reality."

— Pietro C. Marani

Many theories have been proposed about the intended purpose and meaning of the work, which the Galleria Nazionale di Parma suggests is due to the ambiguity in the work's 'painted-drawing' demeanor. Scholars at the Metropolitan Museum of Art note that the contrast between the subject's sculptural and detailed face with her fragmentary hair, shoulders, and neck evokes a similar contrast between intensity and freedom. Scholars at the Galleria Nazionale have interpreted this contrast as a feminist representation of powerful, but elegant, femininity.

The work has been recognized as the apex of Leonardesque sfumato. Nagel notes the attentive detail to masterful shadowing and lighting. Nagel compares La Scapigliata with head studies by Leonardo's teacher, Andrea del Verrocchio, noting the similar approach and attention given to the shading, and that both Verrocchio's studies of female heads and Leonardo's La Scapigliata seem to 'know' that the edge of the panel exists. He concludes that,

"In Leonardo's work, shadow is investigated to the point where it assumes an entirely new role, Shadows no longer "belong" to the form but are treated as variations of a more general visual phenomenon, subject to the laws that govern all visibility. They behave as gradual modulations within a continuous range extending between 'the beginnings and the ends of shadow,' that is, from light to absolute darkness. The shadow against the right cheek ('outside the form') belongs to the same system as the shadows under the chin, on the cheek, or around the eyes; under different conditions, they might unite to swallow the entire face."

It is uncertain what access Leonardo would have had to Pliny the Elder's Natural History, but in 2016 Bambach speculates that La Scapigliata may have been inspired by an anecdote from it. Pliny refers to an unfinished painting of Venus of Cos by the famous ancient Greek painter Apelles that was admired even though it was unfinished. Bambach cites a note from Agostino Vespucci that mentions both Leonardo and this story, and claims that Leonardo was inspired to achieve the same result as Apelles.
