= François Fénelon =

French archbishop, theologian and writer (1651–1715)

His Grace, The Most Reverend François Fénelon P.S.S.
- Archbishop of Cambrai
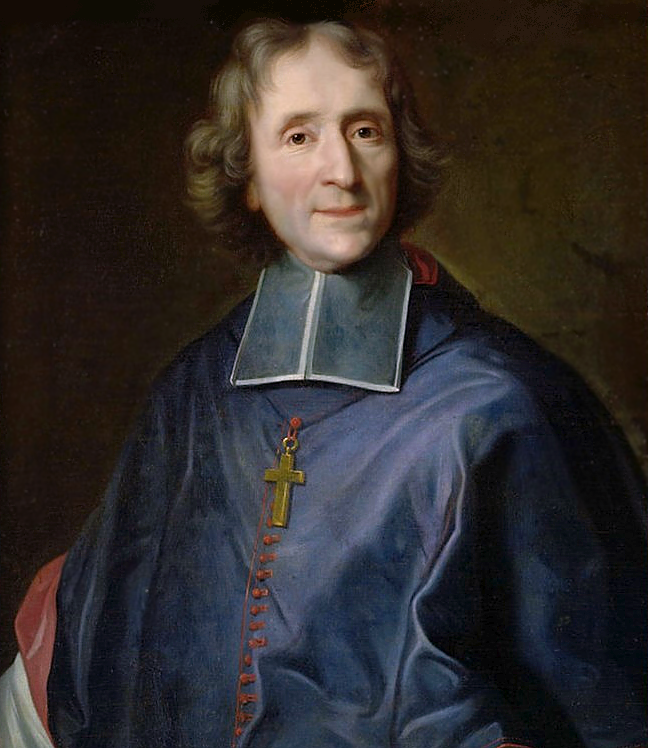
- Portrait by Joseph Vivien
- Church: Roman Catholic
- Archdiocese: Cambrai
- See: Old Cambrai Cathedral
- Installed: 30 May 1695
- Term ended: 7 January 1715
- Predecessor: Jacques-Théodore de Bryas
- Successor: Jean d'Estrées

Personal details
- Born: 6 August 1651 Sainte-Mondane, France
- Died: 7 January 1715 (aged 63) Cambrai, France
- Occupation: Theologian, writer, tutor
- Education: Collège du Plessis

François de Salignac de la Mothe-Fénelon, P.S.S. (French: [fʁɑ̃swa də saliɲak də la mɔt fenəlɔ̃]), more commonly known as François Fénelon (6 August 1651 – 7 January 1715), was a French Catholic archbishop, theologian, poet and writer. Today, he is remembered mostly as the author of The Adventures of Telemachus, first published in 1699. He was a member of the Sulpician Fathers.

== Childhood and education, 1651–75 ==
Fénelon was born on 6 August 1651 at the Château de Fénelon, in Sainte-Mondane, Périgord, Aquitaine, in the Dordogne river valley, the second of the three children of Pons de Salignac, Comte de La Mothe-Fénelon by his wife Louise de La Cropte. Reduced to the status of "impecunious old nobility" by François' time, the La Mothe-Fénelons had produced leaders in both Church and state. At the time of Fénelon's birth, his uncle Francois served as bishop of nearby Sarlat, a see in which fifteen generations of the Fénelon family had filled the episcopal chair. "In fact, so many members of the family occupied the position that it had begun to be considered as practically a familial apanage to which the Salignac-Fénelon had a right as seigneurs of the locality."

Fénelon's early education was provided in the Château de Fénelon by private tutors, who gave him a thorough grounding in the language and literature of the Greek and Latin classics. In 1663, at age 12, he was sent to the University of Cahors, where he studied rhetoric and philosophy under the influence of the Jesuit ratio studiorum. When the young man expressed interest in a career in the church, his uncle, the Marquis Antoine de Fénelon (a friend of Jean-Jacques Olier and Vincent de Paul) arranged for him to study at the Collège du Plessis in Paris, whose theology students followed the same curriculum as the theology students at the Sorbonne. While there, he became friends with Antoine de Noailles, who later became a cardinal and the Archbishop of Paris. Fénelon demonstrated so much talent at the Collège du Plessis that at age 15, he was asked to give a public sermon. About 1672 (i.e. around the time he was 21 years old), Fénelon's uncle managed to get him enrolled in the Séminaire de Saint-Sulpice, the Sulpician seminary in Paris.

== Early years as a priest, 1675–85 ==
Around 1675 (when he would have been 24), Fénelon was ordained as a priest. He initially dreamed of becoming a missionary to the East, but instead, and at the instigation of friends, he preached in Sulpician parishes and performed routine pastoral work as his reputation for eloquence began to grow.

In early 1679, François Harlay de Champvallon, Archbishop of Paris, selected Fénelon as director of Nouvelles-Catholiques, a community in Paris for young Huguenot girls, who had been removed from their families and were about to join the Church of Rome. In 1687, he published a pedagogical work, Traité de l'éducation des filles (Treatise on the Education of Girls), which brought him much attention, not only in France, but abroad as well.

From 1681 to 1695, Fénelon was prior of the fortified monastery at Carennac.

== Missionary to the Huguenots, 1686–87 ==
During this period, Fénelon had become friends with his future rival Jacques-Bénigne Bossuet. When Louis XIV revoked the Edict of Nantes in 1685, the Church began a campaign to send the greatest orators in the country into the regions of France with the highest concentration of Huguenots to persuade them of the errors of Protestantism. Upon Bossuet's suggestion, Fénelon was included in this group, alongside such oratorical greats as Louis Bourdaloue and Esprit Fléchier.

He spent the next three years in the Saintonge region of France preaching to Protestants. He persuaded the king to remove troops from the region and tried to avoid outright displays of religious oppression. But, in the end, he was willing to resort to force to make Protestants listen to his message. He believed that "to be obliged to do good is always an advantage and that heretics and schismatics, when forced to apply their minds to the consideration of truth, eventually lay aside their erroneous beliefs, whereas they would never have examined these matters had not authority constrained them."

== Important friends, 1687–89 ==
During this period, Fénelon assisted Bossuet during his lectures on the Bible at Versailles. It was probably at Bossuet's urging that he now composed his Réfutation du système de Malebranche sur la nature et sur la grâce, a work in which he attacked Nicolas Malebranche's views on optimism, the creation, and the Incarnation. This work was not published until 1820, long after Fénelon's death.

Fénelon also became friendly with the Duc de Beauvilliers and the Duc de Chevreuse, who were married to the daughters of Louis XIV's minister of finance Jean-Baptiste Colbert. He wrote a Treatise on the Existence of God.

In 1688, Fénelon first met his cousin Jeanne Marie Bouvier de la Motte Guyon, usually known simply as Madame Guyon. At that time, she was well received in the social circle of the Beauvilliers and Chevreuses. Fénelon was deeply impressed by her piety and actively discipled her. He would later become a devotee and defend her brand of Quietism.

== Royal tutor, 1689–97 ==
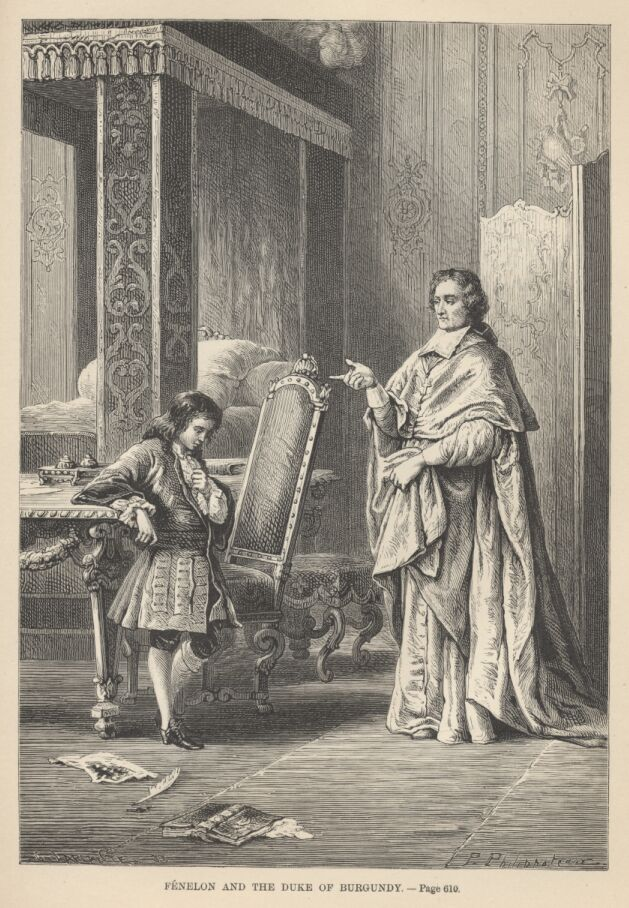
Fénelon and the Duke of Burgundy by Neuville

In 1689, Louis XIV named Fénelon's friend the Duc de Beauvilliers as governor of the royal grandchildren. Upon Beauvilliers' recommendation, Fénelon was named the tutor of the Dauphin's eldest son, the seven-year-old Duke of Burgundy, who was second in line for the throne. This brought him a good deal of influence at court.

As tutor, Fénelon was charged with guiding the character formation of a future King of France. He wrote several important works specifically to guide his young charge. These include his Fables and his Dialogues des Morts.

But by far the most lasting of his works that Fénelon composed for the duke was his Les Aventures de Télémaque [The Adventures of Telemachus, Son of Ulysses], written in 1693–94. On its surface, The Adventures of Telemachus was a novel about Ulysses' son Telemachus. On another level, it became a biting attack on the divine right absolute monarchy which was the dominant ideology of Louis XIV's France. In sharp contrast to Bossuet, who, when tutor to the Dauphin, had written Politique tirée de l'Écriture sainte which affirmed the divine foundations of absolute monarchy while also exhorting the future king to use restraint and wisdom in exercising his absolute power, Fénelon went so far as to write "Good kings are rare and the generality of monarchs bad".

French literary historian Jean-Claude Bonnet calls Télémaque "the true key to the museum of the eighteenth-century imagination". One of the most popular works of the century, it became an immediate best seller both in France and abroad, going through many editions and translated into every European language and even Latin verse (first in Berlin in 1743, then in Paris by Étienne Viel [1737–87]). It inspired numerous imitations, such as the Abbé Jean Terrasson's novel Life of Sethos (1731), which in turn inspired Mozart's Magic Flute. It also more directly supplied the plot for Mozart's opera, Idomeneo (1781). Scenes from Télémaque appeared in wallpaper. The American president Andrew Jackson wallpapered the entrance hall to his slave plantation, The Hermitage, in Tennessee, with scenes from Telemachus on the Island of Calypso.

Most believed Fénelon's tutorship resulted in a dramatic improvement in the young duke's behaviour. Even the memoirist Louis de Rouvroy, duc de Saint-Simon, who generally disliked Fénelon, admitted that when Fénelon became tutor, the duke was a spoiled, violent child; when Fénelon left him, the duke had learned the lessons of self-control as well as being thoroughly impressed with a sense of his future duties. Telemachus is therefore widely seen as the most thorough exposition of the brand of reformism in the Beauvilliers-Chevreuse circle, which hoped that following Louis XIV's death, his brand of autocracy could be replaced by a monarchy less centralised and less absolute, and with a greater role for aristocrats such as Beauvilliers and Chevreuse.

In 1693, Fénelon was elected to Seat 34 of the Académie française.

In 1694, the king named Fénelon Abbot of Saint-Valery, a lucrative post worth 14,000 livres a year.

The early- to mid-1690s are significant since it was during this period that Mme de Maintenon (quasi-morganatic wife of Louis XIV since roughly 1684) began to regularly consult Fénelon on matters of conscience. Also, since Fénelon had a reputation as an expert on educating girls, she sought his advice on the house of Saint-Cyr which she was founding for girls.

In February 1696, the king nominated Fénelon to become the Archbishop of Cambrai while at the same time asking him to remain in his position as tutor to the duke of Burgundy. Fénelon accepted, and he was consecrated by his old friend Bossuet in August.

== Quietist controversy, 1697–99 ==
As already noted, Fénelon had met Madam Guyon in 1688 and became an admirer of her work.

In 1697, following a visit by Mme Guyon to Mme de Maintenon's school at Saint-Cyr, Paul Godet des Marais, Bishop of Chartres (Saint-Cyr was located within his diocese) expressed concerns about Mme Guyon's orthodoxy to Mme de Maintenon. The bishop noted that Mme Guyon's opinions bore striking similarities to Miguel de Molinos' Quietism, which Pope Innocent XI condemned in 1687. Mme de Maintenon responded by requesting an ecclesiastical commission to examine Mme Guyon's orthodoxy: the commission consisted of two of Fénelon's old friends, Bossuet and de Noailles, as well as the head of the Sulpician order of which Fénelon was a member. The commission sat at Issy and, after six months of deliberations, delivered its opinion in the Articles d'Issy, 34 articles which briefly condemned certain of Mme Guyon's opinions, as well as set forth a brief exposition of the Catholic view of prayer. Both Fénelon and the Bishop of Chartres signed the articles, as did all three commission members. Mme Guyon immediately submitted to the decision.

At Issy, the commission asked Bossuet to follow up the Articles with an exposition. Bossuet thus proceeded to write Instructions sur les états d'oraison, which he submitted to the commission members, as well as to the Bishop of Chartres and Fénelon, requesting their signatures before its publication. Fénelon refused to sign, arguing that Mme Guyon had already admitted her mistakes and there was no point in further condemning her. Furthermore, Fénelon disagreed with Bossuet's interpretation of the Articles d'Issy, as he wrote in Explication des Maximes des Saints (a work often regarded as his masterpiece – English: Maxims of the Saints). Fénelon interpreted the Articles d'Issy in a way much more sympathetic to the Quietist viewpoint than Bossuet proposed.

Louis XIV responded to the controversy by chastising Bossuet for not warning him earlier of Fénelon's opinions and ordered Bossuet, de Noailles, and the Bishop of Chartres to respond to the Maximes des Saints. Shocked that his grandson's tutors held such views, the king removed Fénelon from his post as royal tutor and ordered Fénelon to remain within the boundaries of the archdiocese of Cambrai.

This unleashed two years of pamphlet warfare as the two sides traded opinions. On 12 March 1699, the Inquisition formally condemned the Maximes des Saints, with Pope Innocent XII listing 23 specific propositions as unorthodox.

Fénelon immediately declared that he submitted to the pope's authority and set aside his own opinion. With this, the Quietist matter was dropped.

However, that same year, The Adventures of Telemachus was published. This book also enraged Louis XIV, for it appeared to question his regime's very foundations. Thus, even after Fénelon abjured his Quietist views, the king refused to revoke his order forbidding Fénelon from leaving his archdiocese.

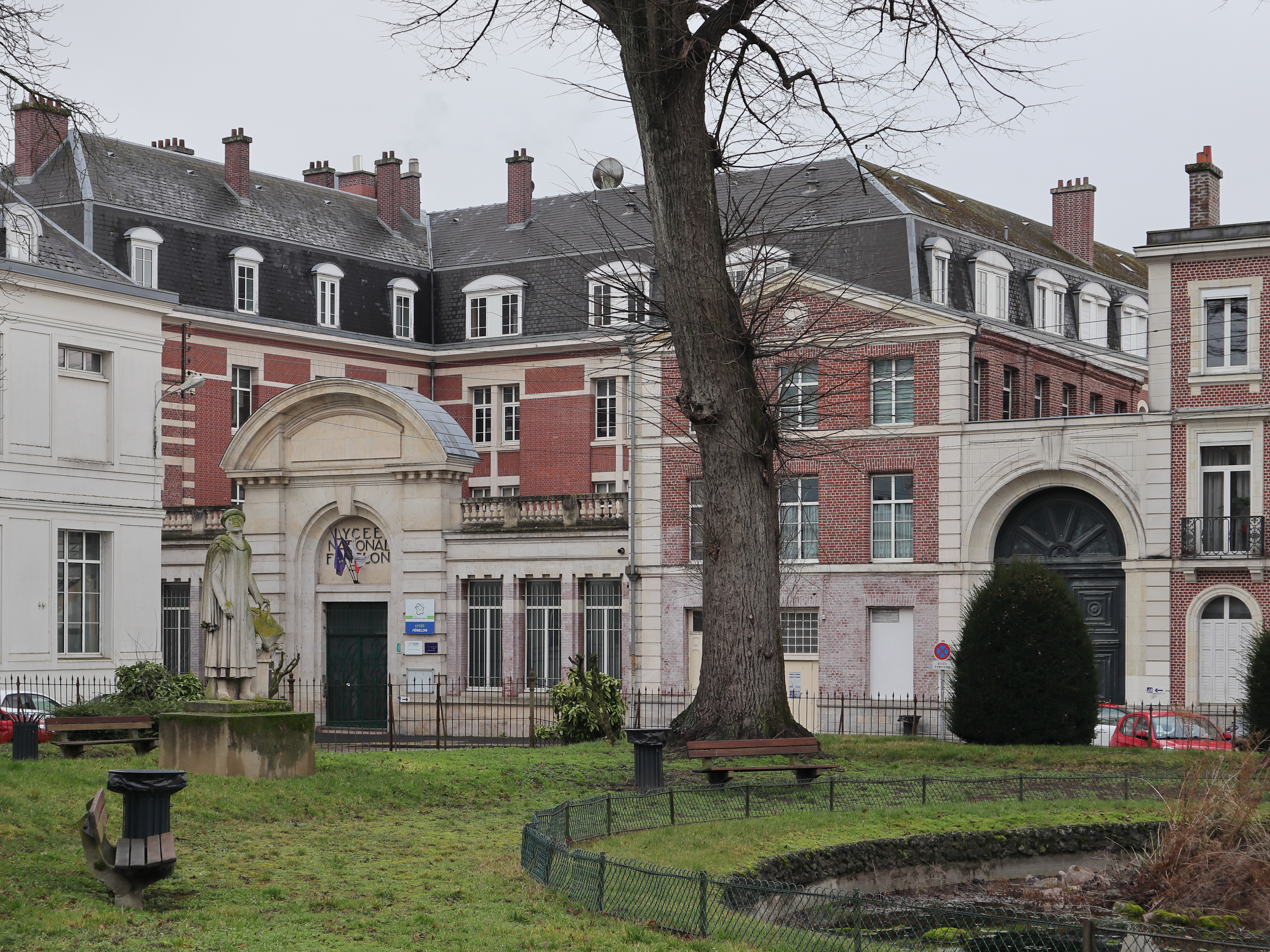
Fénelon Square in front of the Lycée Fénelon in Cambrai

== Later years ==
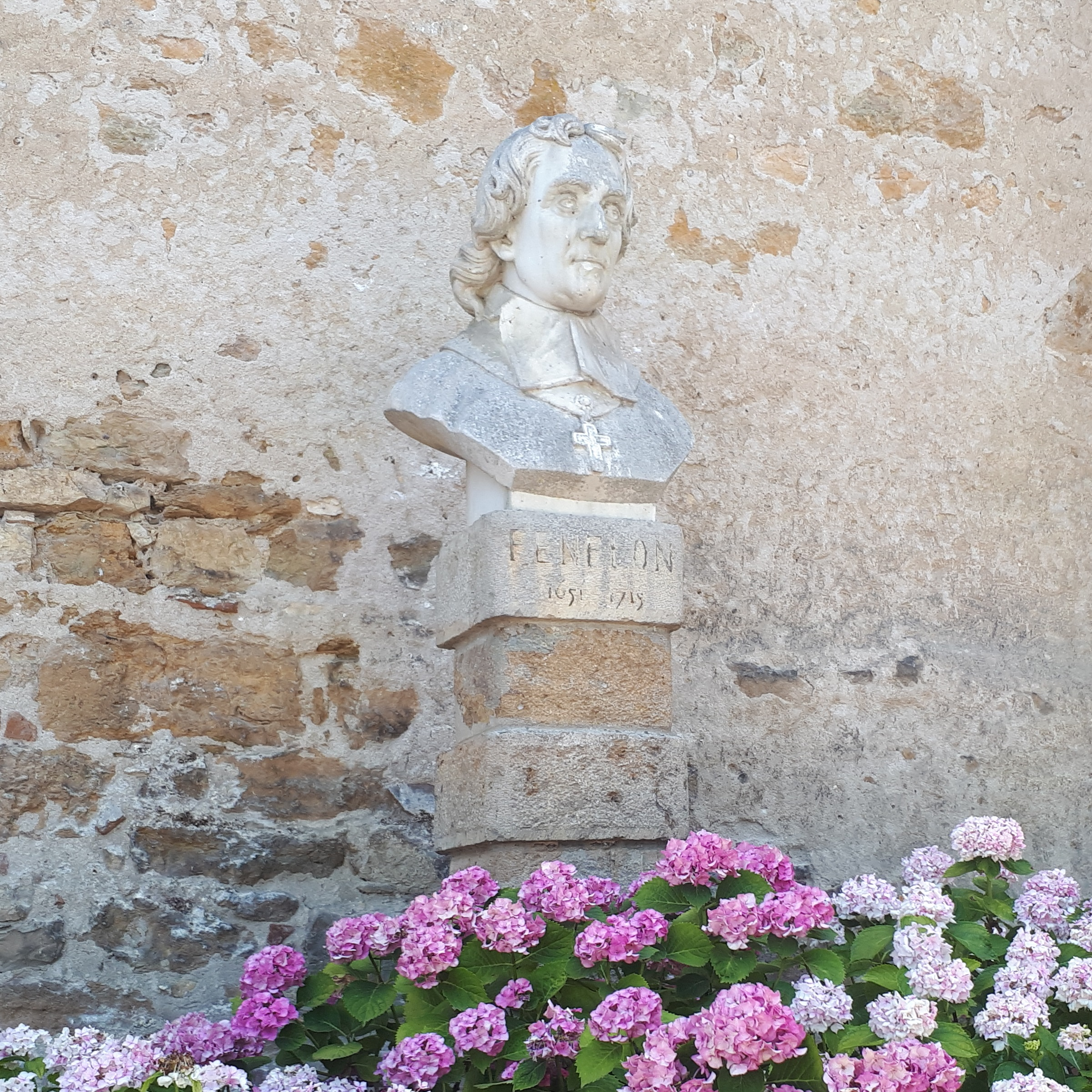
Bust of François Fénelon in Carennac, France

As Archbishop of Cambrai, Fénelon spent most of his time in the archiepiscopal palace, but also spent several months of each year visiting churches and other institutions within his archdiocese. He preached in his cathedral on festival days, and took an especial interest in seminary training and in examining candidates for the priesthood prior to their ordination.

During the War of the Spanish Succession, Spanish troops encamped in his archdiocese (an area France had only recently captured from Spain), but they never interfered with the exercise of his archiepiscopal duties. Warfare, however, produced refugees, and Fénelon opened his palace to refugees fleeing the ongoing conflict.

For Fénelon all wars were civil wars. Humanity was a single society and all wars within it the greatest evil, for he argued that one's obligation to mankind as a whole was always greater than what was owed to one's particular country.

During these latter years, Fénelon wrote a series of anti-Jansenist works. The impetus was the publication of the Cas de Conscience, which revived the old Jansenist distinction between questions of law and questions of fact, and argued that though the church had the right to condemn certain opinions as heretical, it did not have the right to oblige one to believe that these opinions were actually contained in Cornelius Jansen's Augustinus. The treatises, sermons, and pastoral letters Fénelon wrote in response occupy seven volumes in his collected works. Fénelon particularly condemned Pasquier Quesnel's Réflexions morales sur le Nouveau Testament. His writings contributed to the tide of scholarly opinion which led to Pope Clement XI's 1713 bull Unigenitus, condemning Quesnel's opinions.

Although confined to the Cambrai archdiocese in his later years, Fénelon continued to act as a spiritual director for Mme de Maintenon, as well as the ducs de Chevreuse and de Beauvilliers, the duke of Burgundy, and other prominent individuals.

Fénelon's later years were blighted by the deaths of many of his close friends. Shortly before his death, he asked Louis XIV to replace him with a man opposed to Jansenism and loyal to the Sulpician order. He died on 7 January 1715.

== Fénelon as reformer and defender of human rights ==
Fénelon wrote about the dangers of power in government. Historian Paul Hazard remarks that the author posed hard questions for his fictional hero Telemachus to put to Idomeneus, King of Salente:

...those same questions, in the same sorrowing tone, Fénelon puts to to his pupil, the Duc de Bourgogne, against the day, when he will have to take over the royal power: Do you understand the constitution of kingship? Have you acquainted yourself with the moral obligations of Kings? Have you sought means of bringing comfort to the people? The evils that are engendered by absolute power, by incompetent administration, by war, how will you shield your subjects from them? And when in 1711, the same Duc de Bourgogne became Dauphin of France, it was a whole string of reforms that Fénelon submitted to him in preparation for his accession

— Paul Hazard, The European Mind, 1680–1715, translated by J. Lewis May (Cleveland Ohio: Meridian Books [1935] [1963], 1967) p. 282.

Fénelon defended universal human rights, and the unity of humankind. He wrote:

A people is no less a member of the human race, which is society as a whole, than a family is a member of a particular nation. Each individual owes incomparably more to the human race, which is the great fatherland, than to the particular country in which he was born. As a family is to the nation, so is the nation to the universal commonweal; wherefore it is infinitely more harmful for nation to wrong nation, than for family to wrong family. To abandon the sentiment of humanity is not merely to renounce civilization and to relapse into barbarism, it is to share in the blindness of the most brutish brigands and savages; it is to be a man no longer, but a cannibal.

— Fénelon, "Socrate et Alcibiade", Dialogue des Morts (1718), quoted in Paul Hazard, The European Mind, 1680–1715 (1967), pp. 282–283.

He also wrote of women's education as a means against heresy.

The world is not abstraction; it is the sum total of families; and who can civilize it more effectively than women . . . [The concerns of women] are scarcely less important to the public than those of men, since women have a household to rule, a husband to make happy, and children to bring up well . . . In short, one has to consider not only the good which women do when they are well brought up, but also the evil which they cause in the world when they lack an education which inspires them to virtue..."

— H. C. Barnard, Fénelon on Education: A Translation of the 'Traité de l'education des filles' and Other Documents Illustrating Fénelon's Educational Theories and Practice, Together with an Introduction and Notes (Cambridge: Cambridge University Press, 1966), pp. 2–3., quoted in Racel, Masako N. Thesis (2011). Finding their Place in the World: Meiji Intellectuals and the Japanese Construction of an East-West Binary, 1868–1912 (Thesis). Georgia State University.

== Works ==
- The Adventures of Telemachus, (Digitised Edition at E-rara.ch)
- Treatise on the Education of Daughters
- Dialogues of the Dead
- Lives of the Ancient Philosophers
- Christian Perfection
- The Existence of God
- Let Go
- Dialogues of Fénelon Vol.1
- Spiritual Letters of Fénelon
- The Complete Fénelon
- Talking With God
- A Month with François Fénelon: 31 Days of Reflections and Meditations
- A Guide to True Peace
- The Royal Way of the Cross
- Meditations on the Heart of God
- The Best Of Fenelon
- Maxims of the Mystics
- The Inner Life
- Spiritual Letters (2 volumes, letters to men; letters to women, Rivingtons, London, 1877)

== Homage ==
Rev. A. W. Tozer highly praises François Fénelon's Inner Life (Christian Perfection), valuing its profound spiritual insights and practical guidance for deepening one's relationship with God. Tozer regards it as an essential read for those earnest in pursuing a devout Christian life, emphasising its timeless significance. Tozer cherished Fénelon's Christian Perfection deeply, never lending it out, and considered it an unparalleled aid to spiritual life.

William Godwin later referenced Fénelon in Book II, Chapter II of his Enquiry Concerning Political Justice, as an example of man whose life and continued authorship of important works was so valuable to society at large, that if his palace was in flames and someone was in a position to rescue either Fénelon or his valet (some editions say chambermaid), we should rescue Fenelon, even if the servant was our close relative.

== Biography ==
- H. L. Sidney Lear, Fenelon, Archbishop of Cambrai: A Biographical Sketch (London, 1877).
- Stafford Harry Northcote, Viscount Saint Cyres, François de Fénelon (London: Methuen & Co., 1901).

== See also ==
- Human rights
- Christian mysticism
- François de Salignac de la Mothe-Fénelon (missionary) – half-brother and missionary
