= Salignac, Gironde =

Salignac
- Part of Val-de-Virvée
- Coat of arms
- Location of Salignac
- Location within France Location within Nouvelle-Aquitaine
- Coordinates: 45°00′58″N 0°22′51″W
- Country: France
- Region: Nouvelle-Aquitaine
- Department: Gironde
- Arrondissement: Blaye
- Canton: Le Nord-Gironde
- Commune: Val-de-Virvée
- Area^{1}: 11.82 km^{2} (4.56 sq mi)
- Elevation: 45 m (148 ft)
- Population (2022): 1,989
  - Density: 168.3/km^{2} (435.8/sq mi)
- Time zone: UTC+01:00 (CET)
  - Summer (DST): UTC+02:00 (CEST)
- Postal code: 33240
- ^{1} French Land Register data, which excludes lakes, ponds, glaciers > 1 km^{2} (0.386 sq mi or 247 acres) and river estuaries.

Salignac (French pronunciation: [saliɲak]; Gascon: Salinhac) is a former commune in the Gironde department in southwestern France. On 1 January 2016, it was merged into the new commune Val-de-Virvée.

== Population ==
Historical population

Year	Pop.	±% p.a.
1793	1,019	—
1821	999	−0.07%
1846	993	−0.02%
1872	958	−0.14%
1901	831	−0.49%
1926	733	−0.50%
1946	712	−0.15%
1962	659	−0.48%

Year	Pop.	±% p.a.
1968	673	+0.35%
1975	649	−0.52%
1982	941	+5.45%
1990	1,188	+2.96%
1999	1,134	−0.52%
2012	1,594	+2.65%
2022	1,989	+2.24%

Source: EHESS and INSEE (2012-2022)

== See also ==
- Communes of the Gironde department
