= Château de Salignac =

French castle in Salignac-Eyvigues

Coordinates: 44°58′29.5″N 1°19′36″E

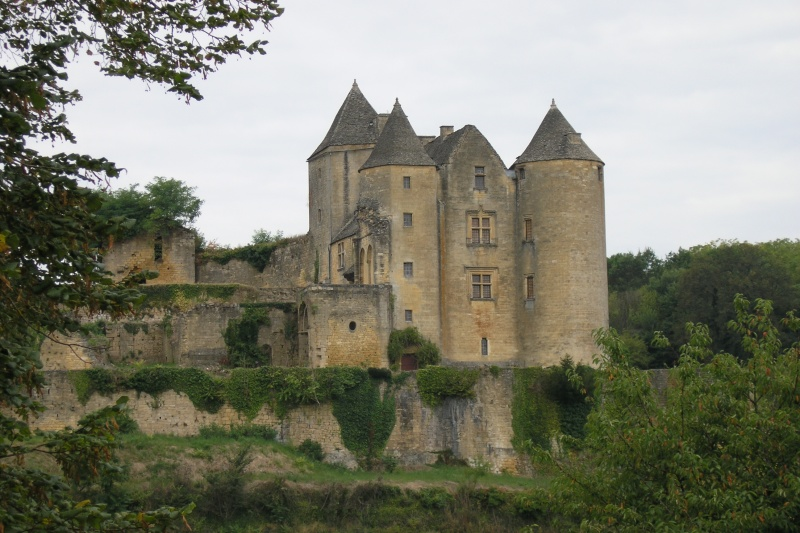
Château de Salignac

The Château de Salignac is the former castle of the Salignac-Fénelon family in the commune of Salignac-Eyvigues in the Dordogne département of France. It dates from the 11th-15th centuries.

It has been classified since 1969 as a monument historique by the French Ministry of Culture.

== See also ==
- List of castles in France
