= Château de Fénelon =

Castle in France

Coordinates: 44°50′32″N 1°21′01″E

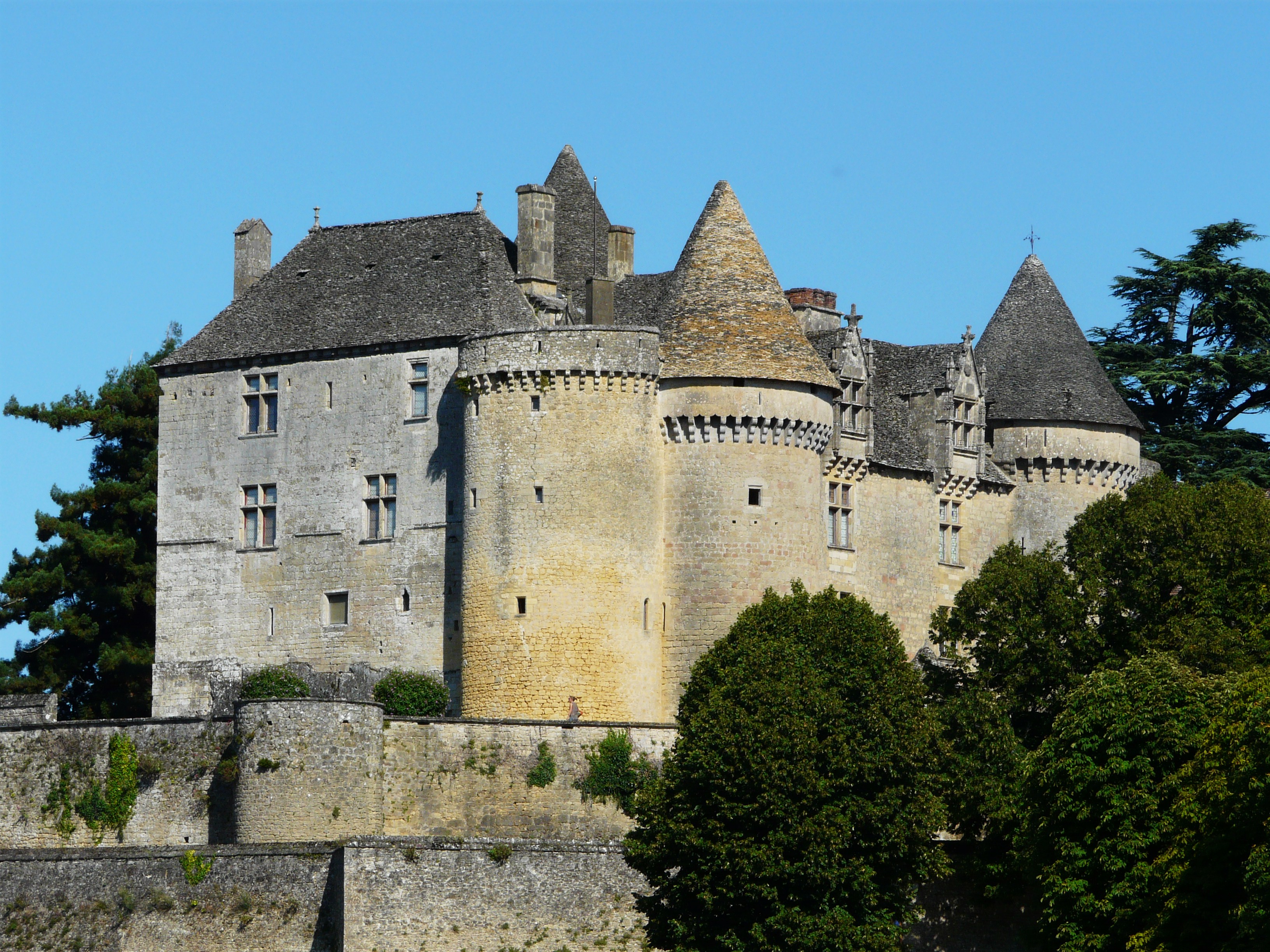

The Château de Fénelon is a château in Dordogne, Nouvelle-Aquitaine, France.

== History ==
The site has been inhabited since at least the 11th century, with the oldest surviving parts of the building dating from the 12th century. It is probably most famous as the birthplace of François Fénelon, the famous 17th-century archbishop, theologian, and writer. It was designated a national heritage site in 1962.

== In Film ==
The privately owned château is occasionally used as a set for movies, some of which are:

- Vice and Virtue, directed by Roger Vadim in 1963
- Part of the château's exterior served as the home of Danielle de Barbarac (Drew Barrymore) in the 1998 film Ever After, alongside the exterior of the Château de la Roussie, which was also presented as part of the character's home.
- The Last Duel, directed by Ridley Scott in 2021
