= Sharmat =

Sharmat is a surname. Notable people with the surname include:

- Craig Sharmat (born 1957), American musician
- Marjorie W. Sharmat (1928–2019), American children's writer
