= Joan Cushing =

American satirist and playwright (1946–2024)

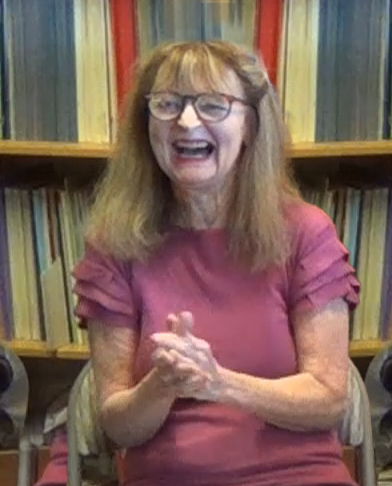
- Cushing in 2017
- Born: August 18, 1946; Evanston, IL U.S.
- Died: May 21, 2024 (aged 77)
- Education: University of Maryland (BS)
- Occupations: Comedian, satirist; Writer; Composer, lyricist; Singer; Playwright
- Years active: 1975–2024
- Website: https://www.joancushing.com/

Joan Cushing (August 18, 1946 – May 21, 2024) was a political satirist and playwright. She is best known for her character Mrs. Foggybottom, a wise-cracking society woman who wittily mocked Washington, D.C. as part of her cabaret shows and other appearances from the 70s through the mid-90s. In a 1987 article, The Washington Post dubbed her "The Clown of Powertown." Her next gig was writing musicals for young audiences. A 2001 commission by Imagination Stage to adapt Harry Allard and James Marshall's humorous children's book Miss Nelson Is Missing! to the stage led to many more similar collaborations with the theatre, as well as with others.

== Early life and family ==
Joan was the oldest of eight children. Her mother, Marie Donnelly Cushing, was a talented pianist who received a scholarship to Webster College. Marie married her former high school boyfriend, Vincent Cushing, in 1945. Vincent graduated from the University of Notre Dame with degrees in physics and mathematics. Many earlier Cushing family members also had attended the university, including Vincent's father, John F. Cushing, who donated $300,000 to Notre Dame to build a hall of engineering. At the Illinois Institute of Technology, Vincent Cushing received a Doctorate in Physics. He went on to have a distinguished career, and was awarded 28 patents. In 1967, with her eight children attending, Marie graduated from American University with a bachelor's degree. She became a teacher of low-income children with Head Start during the program's early years. In 1982, she received a master's degree at Notre Dame College of Belmont, CA in Montessori education, subsequently becoming a head primary teacher. The Cushing children were raised in Winnetka, IL (near Chicago), Kensington, MD, Deerfield, IL, and Huntington, NY. Marie and Vincent's marriage lasted nearly 75 years, ending with his death in 2018. Marie died in February 2023.

== Political satire ==
After graduating from the University of Maryland in 1970, Joan Cushing taught second grade in Landover Hills, Maryland. At night, she moonlighted as a singer and pianist at area piano bars. Eventually Cushing decided she was having more fun playing piano than teaching children. Mrs. Foggybottom, a gossipy dowager, became a staple character in her act after the owner of the Fire Escape Lounge in Alexandria, Virginia suggested using comic chit-chat between songs to engage the audiences at this club above the former Café Lafayette. The character was named after a district in DC where the Watergate Complex, State Department and George Washington University are located. She and Mrs. Foggybottom would go on to perform there on Fridays and Saturdays for nine and a half years, gaining notoriety and fans.

Cushing and her character Mrs. Foggybottom also became known through appearances in Washington, D.C.'s Hexagon, an annual benefit political comedy revue. Cushing was a performer, writer, and songwriter for Hexagon for at least 15 years. Hexagon re-emerged in 2023 after a break during the pandemic.

By 1987, Cushing was considered part of the "upper crust" of Beltway comics, along with Art Buchwald and Mark Russell. Her "Mrs. Foggybottom" character gave a humorous take on political news, and threw zingers at Capitol Hill personalities while wearing white gloves, rhinestone glasses, and a feathered hat, drinking a martini and clutching a cigarette holder. Mrs. Foggybottom's top choice in books was the Green Book, and her favorite vacation destination was the Betty Ford Center. Cushing wrote original songs for her aging Washington socialite, such as the "Water Music Minuet," which joked that "the Trickle-Down Theory [was] working at last" with mandatory drug testing under the Reagan administration. "Political satire has an essential role in this town," she once told The Washington Post. "People do take themselves too seriously."

Cushing appeared both as herself, and as her society woman Mrs. Foggybottom, at political parties, conventions, and events. Mrs. Foggybottom's out-of-town gigs had a $1,500 price tag. Cushing also wrote a column for the Georgetowner and Roll Call.

Eventually Cushing's show became a multi-person revue, "Mrs. Foggybottom & Friends," which opened at the New Playwrights Theatre in 1986, and then moved to the Omni Shoreham Hotel’s Marquee Lounge in Northwest Washington, D.C. "Mrs. Foggybottom & Friends" ran until 1995, when the hotel changed owners. In 2014, she told The Beacon that she didn't expect to quit performing when they lost the venue. "I stopped after the Shoreham [was sold], but I expected to start up again and just didn't." Cushing told The Washington Post that she never revisited the accompanied version of the revue because of the death of its director, Ron O’Leary.

In 1988, Mrs. Foggybottom campaigned for President as the candidate of the "Cocktail Party," declaring, "I believe that what the country needs after eight years of Ronald Reagan is a four-year happy hour." Candidate Foggybottom promised that by the time she left office, every American would be able to spell the term "hors d’oeuvres."

== Adult musicals ==
While Mrs. Foggybottom was making special appearances from time to time, Cushing was also busy re-inventing herself as a playwright.

=== Flush ===
In July 1998, Cushing's original musical Flush! opened the Source Theatre Company's 18th Annual Washington Theatre Festival along with Roy Barber's musical Gift. Describing the origins of her play to The Washington Post, Cushing said, "I took a wedding and a funeral and thought, ‘Wouldn’t it be funny to do a revue where you only see people in the restroom?’... People’s anxieties come out, you have secrets."

=== Tussaud ===
Next up, in 2000, was the macabre and dark story of real-life waxworker Madame Tussaud. According to Joan Cushing's website, her musical Tussaud "attempts to strip away the carnival atmosphere, and put a human face on the woman who was at the very center of one of the most turbulent and bloody periods of French history." Madame Tussaud was born Marie Grosholtz, and she was trained by a Swiss master waxworker, Phillippe Curtius, during the French Revolution. Marie developed her trade by casting death masks of famous people from their guillotined heads. Cushing's musical Tussaud was presented through at least four staged readings from 2000 to 2006, including another opening slot at the Washington Theatre Festival in 2000. There Cushing won the Pat Murphy Sheehy New Play Fund Award, and the cast, directors and musicians were honored for their ensemble work. In 2006, Tussaud received a full production at the University of Florida's Footlights Theatre in Tampa, Florida. Song titles included "Familiar Faces/Carry On," “I’ve Got a Date with Voltaire," “Bonjour, Robespierre," and "In My Hands."

=== Breast in Show ===
In 2011 the musical Breast in Show was first produced, with Cushing writing the music and lyrics and playwright Lisa Hayes, the script and book. The idea for a musical about breast cancer came in 2009 to the play's executive producer Eileen Mitchard, who wanted to give voice to those touched by the disease. The show was based on over 200 interviews done by Mitchard, Hayes and Cushing over a two-year period. The project had to be postponed in 2010, when Cushing's husband Paul Buchbinder was dying of pancreatic cancer. Cushing found that returning to writing the musical after her husband passed was an experience of healing, bringing a new awareness and a feeling that she had something to say. The production's director was Kathryn Chase Bryer, who was working with Cushing at Imagination Stage on theatre for young audiences. The Breast of Show script featured four women and one man with breast cancer. The show's goals included raising awareness about the disease, and in an interview with the Quad-City Times, executive producer Mitchard said, "It'll make you laugh, it'll make you cry. It'll make you do both at the same moment, but it ends on a hopeful note." The show received six full productions, starting with the JCC Theatre in Rockville, Maryland in 2011. Promotion for Breast of Show at the 2014 Capital Fringe Festival proclaimed, "This is the show that puts humor in the tumor." DC Theatre Arts reviewer Terry Byrne wrote, "…hats off to composer/lyricist Joan Cushing… I cannot summon enough praise for Cushing’s creations." The show has been performed over 30 times, including productions at the Acts of Faith Festival in Richmond, Virginia in March 2013, the Circa '21 Dinner Playhouse in Rock Island, Illinois in October 2013, the Art Barn in Gaithersburg, Maryland in September 2014, and O'Connell and Company of Buffalo, New York in September and October 2016.

== Theatre for Young Audiences (TYA) musicals ==
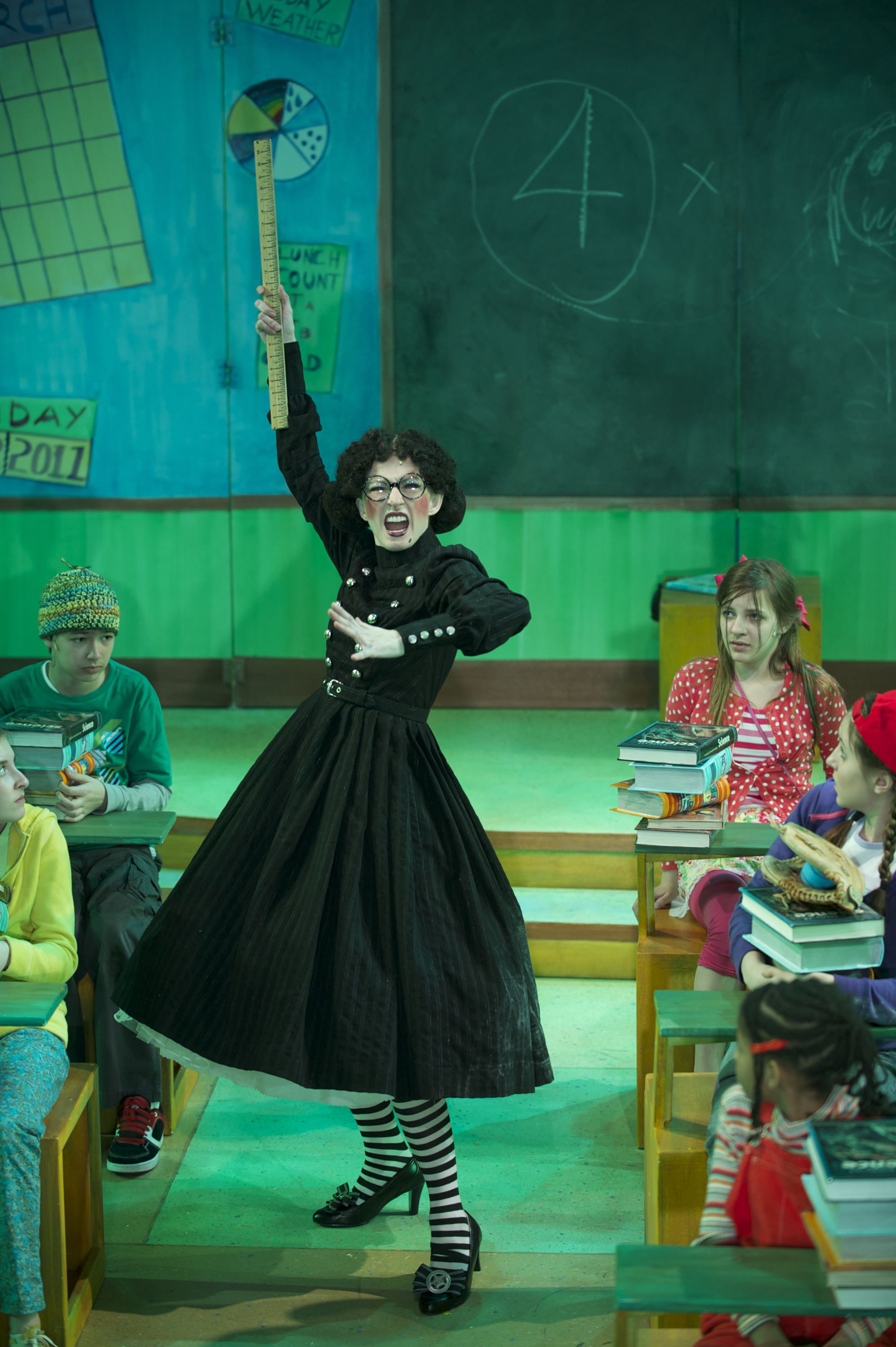
Dress rehearsal for musical Miss Nelson Is Missing! at the First Stage Theatre of Milwaukee on April 27, 2011. Photographed by Mark Frohna.

Cushing's theatre writing took a new direction after she was commissioned in 2001 by Imagination Stage to adapt the popular children's book Miss Nelson Is Missing! by author Harry Allard and illustrator James Marshall. She developed the book into a musical for their theatre at White Flint Mall. This would be her first Theatre for Young Audiences (TYA) project. "It is a very edgy, witty, clever book," Cushing told The Washington Post. "I like writing for other people. I'm not performing right now." The story is about a class of uncontrollable kids at Horace B. Smedley Elementary School whose sweet teacher, Miss Nelson, stops showing up. In her place is the ferocious hag, Miss Viola Swamp, who the children hate and fear. Suddenly the children have a new appreciation for their missing teacher. Cushing used much of the language of the book in the script and lyrics (such as the kids considering if "a swarm of angry butterflies" took their teacher away). She interspersed items for adults to enjoy, such as theatre references, local topics, and politics. This show was performed as far away as China and Papua New Guinea, and remained in production through 2023. Describing a production at the Manhattan Children's Theater in 2005, The New York Times reviewer Laurel Graeber said, "A gifted playwright and composer, Ms. Cushing has created a musical that will charm anyone who has ever sat in front of a schoolteacher's desk – or, for that matter, behind it."

Imagination Stage also commissioned Cushing's adaptation of author Barbara Park and illustrator Denise Brunkus’s book Junie B. Jones and a Little Monkey Business! The show opened at the Imagination Stage's new $12 million center in July 2003. This musical centers on a raucous five-year-old kindergartener (Junie B. Jones) who steps on stage and sings "The World According to Me," underscoring how she rules her world. Soon she has to deal with the worrisome, pending arrival of a sibling. Also, Junie has no idea what to share in the next show-and-tell at school. The two issues combine to lead the musical into humorous developments. Interviewed about her TYA playwriting process at the time by The Washington Post, Cushing commented, "I gear them to kids, but I don't write down to them. I write them for families... I think it's nice when a grandparent and a child can go to a musical together and get something from it." While Cushing's central story was from Park's monkey business book, she lifted scenes from other books in the Junie B. Jones series to make the play work. "I didn't feel there was enough in that book to write a whole musical on," Cushing shared with The Washington Post. "...I had to go and wrap my arms around the whole series to really feel the characters."

Cushing went on to write additional TYA musicals commissioned by Imagination Stage, including Miss Nelson Has a Field Day!, Petite Rouge: A Cajun Red Riding Hood, Heidi, George & Martha: Tons of Fun and 101 Dalmatians.

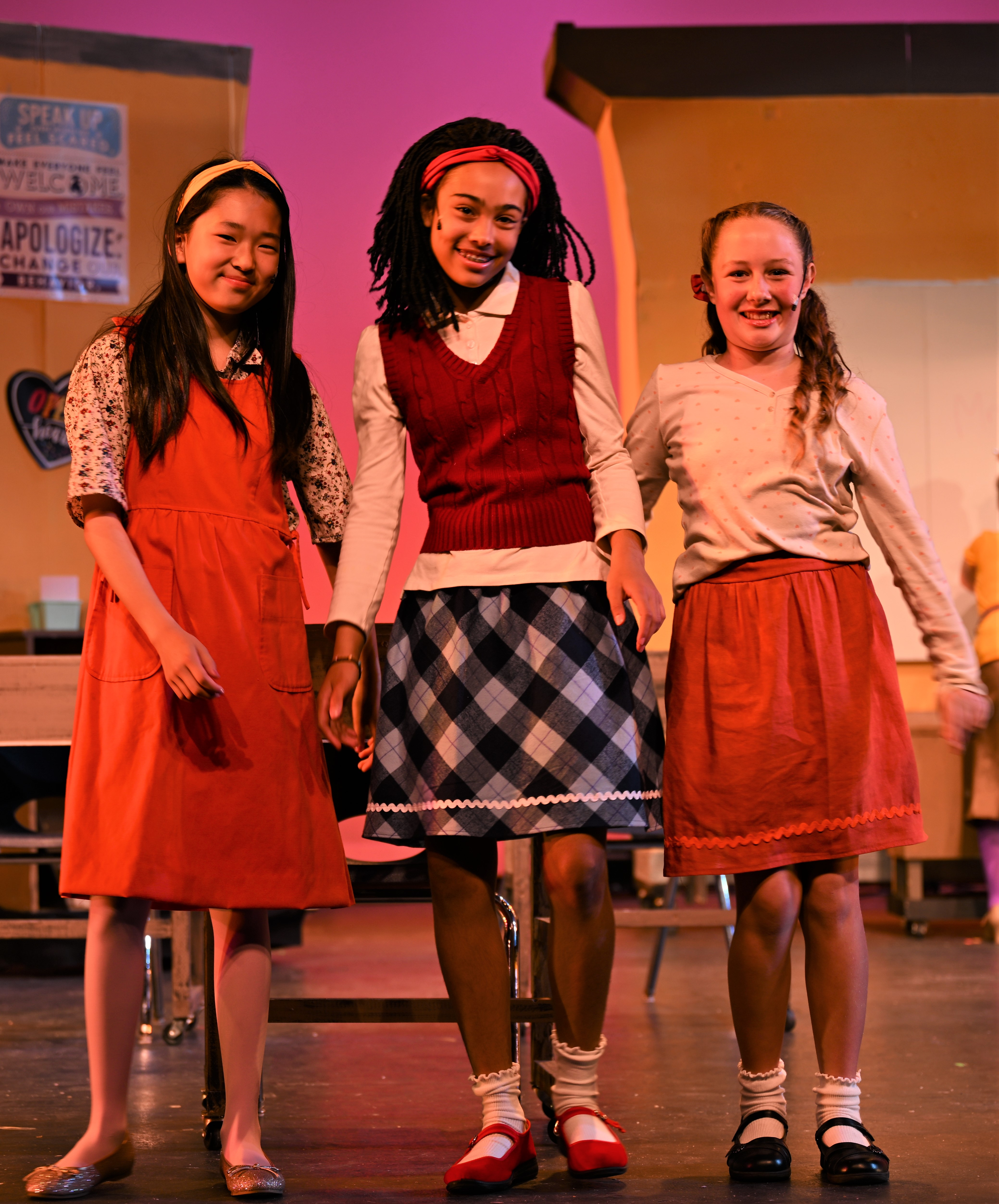
Grace and friends in musical Grace for President at the San Diego Junior Theatre in Summer 2023. Photographed by Marc Akiyama.

The Children's Theatre of Charlotte premiered two Cushing TYA musicals, Ella's Big Chance: a Jazz Age Cinderella in 2015, which despite its Roaring 20s costumes and jazzy dance numbers only received one run, and Grace for President in 2016, which also was produced elsewhere and as recently as 2023. The Grace musical is based on a 2008 book by author Kelly DiPucchio and illustrator LeUyen Pham. Looking at a school display featuring US presidents, Grace discovers that a woman has never held America's highest office. In response, she decides to run for president of her class. Grace's opponent is Thomas Cobb, a popular young man with a big ego. Musical numbers include "The Democracy Rap" ala the musical Hamilton, as well as "Boys, Boys, Boys" and "My Vote Counts." According to the River Cities Reader review in April 2022 of the Circa '21 Dinner Playhouse's production, Grace delivers "important messages" about voting, using one's voice and more through fun songs and dancing and lively characters.

For her musical Diary of a Worm, a Spider & a Fly, Cushing combined three popular children's books by author Doreen Cronin and illustrator Harry Bliss, Diary of a Worm, Diary of a Spider and Diary of a Fly, to create an exploration of friendship, differences and the individual contribution each being gives to their world. The play, commissioned by the Oregon Children's Theatre, premiered in Portland, Oregon in 2011. During the show, the audience comes to know what excites each character, and what makes them feel insecure. Worm frets about having no legs or wings, and thus no value. Spider is impatient to shed his exoskeleton and grow. Fly wonders if her dreams of becoming a superhero will ever come true. Information about bugs is interwoven into relatable struggles through hip-hop, ballads, and dance. The Dallas Morning News reported on a local production in 2012, saying: “This raucous, joyous show, rapping spiritedly at Dallas Children's Theatre, offers an intoxicating mix of educational and entertaining fare… it's a memorable biology lesson and uplifting message for kids seeking their own special role in the world."

== Legacy ==
Joan Cushing's musicals for young audiences have been produced in theatres across the United States, and some continue to be performed today.Miss Nelson Is Missing! has seen over 100 productions and traveled the world. The playwright's agent is Susan Gurman, and the Gurman Agency's Theatre for Youth website shows a list of the accessible Cushing TYA plays. These include Miss Nelson Is Missing!, Miss Nelson Has a Field Day!, Grace for President, Diary of a Worm, a Spider & a Fly, Petite Rouge: A Cajun Red Riding Hood, George and Martha, Heidi and more.

On April 20, 2024, classmates, Cushing family members and friends of Joan Cushing gathered in the theatre lobby of The Academy of the Holy Cross to honor her as well as celebrate the 60th anniversary of her class of 1964. As part of a capital-raising campaign, the box office of the school’s theatre will be named after Joan Cushing “in perpetuity,” and the event included the dedication of a plaque to be hung at the box office. At the event, high school classmate Rosalie Cummings Whitlock said: “This is truly a special day for us… because we’re getting together to celebrate our beloved classmate, family member and friend, Joan Cushing. Joan has been blessed with many, many talents and gifts. She has extraordinary musical capabilities, limitless creativity… She has given so many gifts to all of us, and we’re very, very grateful.” During the reunion, classmates shared their memories of times with Joan, including attending the first Beatles live American concert in Washington, DC, going to parties at Joan’s house, and attending her Mrs. Foggybottom performances. Her son, musician Ben Buchbinder, played a selection of his mother’s favorite songs on the piano, including “My Funny Valentine.” A mini-documentary about Joan’s many accomplishments, produced specifically for the event, was shown and viewed. Family members also spoke. David Cushing, one of Joan’s many younger brothers, said, “Thank you all for this. We’re just thrilled.”

== Critical response ==
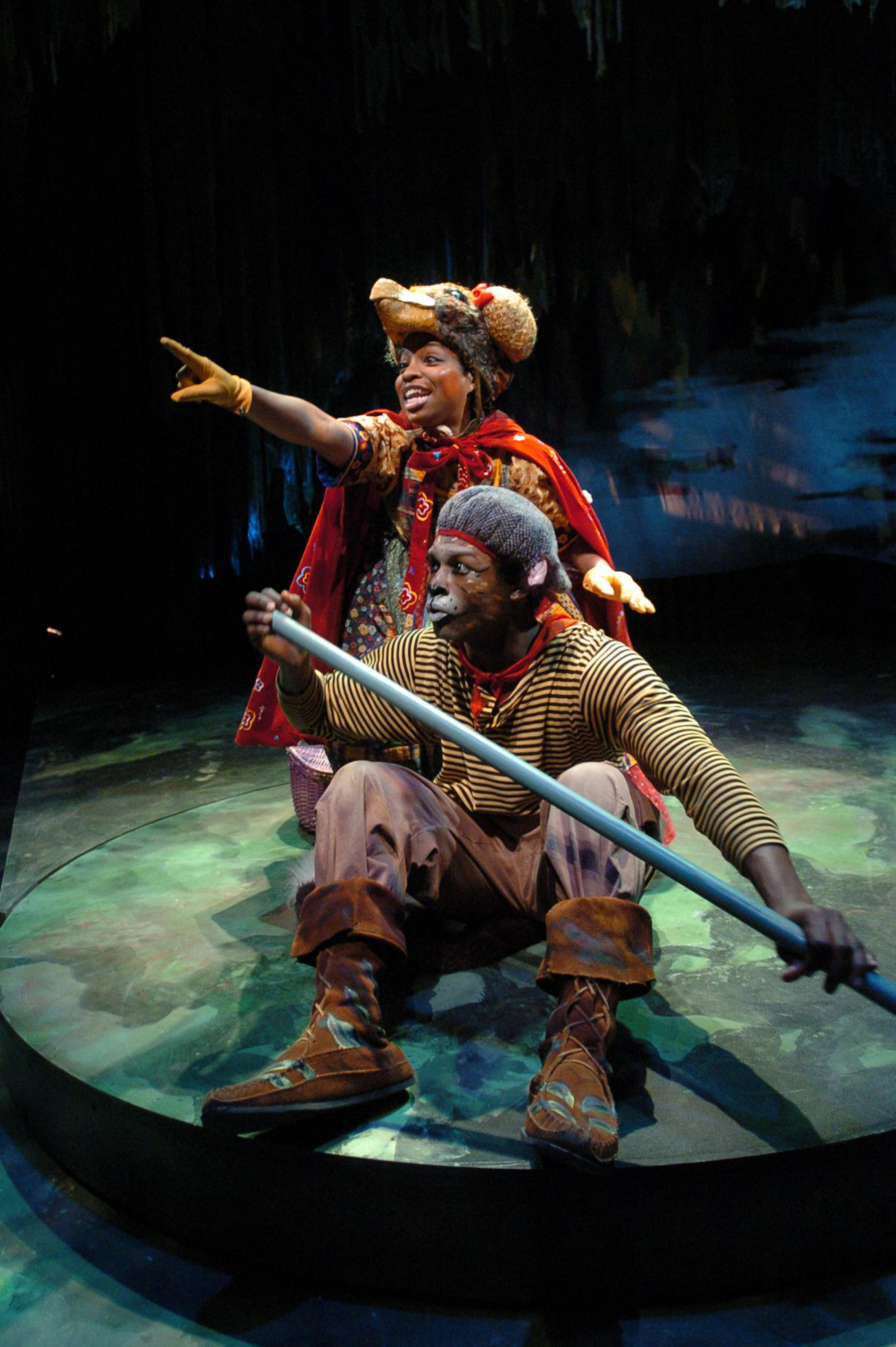
Scene from Musical Petite Rouge during premiere in 2005 at Imagination Stage of Bethesda, Maryland. Photographed by Stan Barouh.

It is clearly in Theatre for Young Audiences where Joan Cushing made her mark in playwriting, creating the book (script), lyrics and music for most of her musical adaptations of popular children's books. For the premiere of Petite Rouge: A Cajun Red Riding Hood at Imagination Stage in 2005, Jayne Blanchard of The Washington Times wrote: “Mrs. Foggybottom has gone zydeco… in a variation of Red Riding Hood that is as snappy as a string of cayenne peppers… You are hard pressed to keep your toes from tapping… Petite Rouge is a feast for the senses and the appetite, as Miss Cushing's adaptation revels in the sights, music and food of Cajun country." In a 2008 Washington Post piece featuring the 100th production of Miss Nelson Is Missing!, Celia Wren says, "…it’s easy to see why the show has so many notches on its belt. It brims with conflict and drama, without being scary; it balances the perspectives of its zany adult and obstreperous child characters; and it revels in sly comic touches." On Grace for President in The Charlotte Observer during 2016, critic Lawrence Toppman reports, "She tells the story so rousingly that children in the audience were cheering for Grace and Thomas by the end, like nominations at a political convention." For a 2018 Cyrano's Theatre Company production of Diary of a Worm, a Spider & a Fly in Alaska, the Anchorage Press professed, "…this musical coming of age tale will ring true for the young, and the young at heart."

Criticisms in her reviews are rare but occasionally can be found. Toppman in his same overall positive review of Grace for President notes that some of Cushing's facts are wrong. For instance, George Washington's teeth weren't made of wood, but of ivory, bone and metal. Washington Post critic Celia Wren in her review "Junie B.'s Playground: 'Monkey Business' Is Pure Fun" found the musical overall to be a "pleasantly idiosyncratic romp that also addresses a serious family issue: a child's jealousy and insecurity when a sibling is born." Yet she felt the music didn't "live up to the show's other assets," or earlier scores by Cushing such as the "memorably flavorful score for Petite Rouge: a Cajun Red Riding Hood."

== Personal life ==
Cushing was married to Paul J. Buchbinder, a sales representative for Wall Goldfinger, a furniture manufacturer. He was a graduate of Brown University. Their marriage lasted 25 years, ending when Paul died in 2010, only four months after receiving a pancreatic cancer diagnosis. Of that time, in 2011 Joan wrote: “Those four months were the hardest, most heartbreaking, and yet most intensely loving of our… marriage.” In a 2011 interview by The Washington Post, Cushing added that after Paul’s death “my whole world just turned upside down. I’ve had a really hard time, but doing these projects [the musicals] is saving me." She has three sons, Ben, Patrick and Christopher. Her son Ben Buchbinder is a New Orleans musician, appearing in nightclubs like his mother did in her early days of performing.

== Death ==
On May 21, 2024, Joan Cushing died at age 77 in a Columbia, Maryland care facility. She had long-term Parkinson's disease. In her obituary for Joan, Washington Post writer Emily Langer described her as "a fixture of the Washington theatrical scene who entertained audiences of all ages, first as the plume-hatted Mrs. Foggybottom in a long-running political satire revue and later as a nationally known creator of plays for children."

== Awards and honors ==
- Flush!, 1998, 18th Annual Washington Theatre Festival. --H.D. Lewis Award for Playwright Development
- Tussaud, 2000, 20th Annual Washington Theatre Festival. --Pat Sheehy New Play Fund Award; --Ensemble Award
- Miss Nelson Is Missing!, 2002, National Children's Theatre Festival Award. --Best New Musical (Winner)
- Miss Nelson Has a Field Day!, 2005, National Children's Theatre Festival Award. --Best New Musical (Finalist)
- Junie B. Jones & a Little Monkey Business!, 2006, Leon Rabin Award, 7 Nominations, including Outstanding Production (Dallas Children's Theatre)
- Junie B. Jones & a Little Monkey Business!, 2007, Creative Loafing Award, 8 Nominations, including Best Musical (Children's Theatre of Charlotte)
- Petite Rouge: A Cajun Red Riding Hood, 2007, New York Musical Theatre Festival's Awards for Excellence. --Next Link Project; --Best in Script (Honorable Mention)
- The Christmas Doll, 2007. --National Youth Theatre Award, Outstanding Play/Musical
- Heidi, 2009. --Helen Hayes Nomination for Outstanding Resident Production, Theatre for Young Audiences, Imagination Stage
- Joan Cushing, Playwright, 2011. --Imagination Award for service to children’s theatre, from the Imagination Stage
- Breast in Show, 2014, Capital Fringe Festival. --Scene Stealer; --Most Heartfelt Performance by an Ensemble

== Musicals ==
Unless noted otherwise, Joan Cushing wrote the play’s script-book, music and lyrics.

=== Adult musicals ===
- Flush!, July 8, 1998, Source Theatre Company's 18th Annual Washington Theatre Festival, Washington, DC
- Tussaud, August 5, 6, 12, 13, 2006, Footlights Theatre, University of South Florida, Tampa, FL
- Breast in Show (Music & Lyrics by Joan Cushing / Script-Book by Lisa Hayes / Show Concept, Eileen Mitchard), October 15 through October 16, 2011, JCC Theatre, Rockville, MD

=== Family musicals ===
- The Christmas Doll, adapted from the book by Elvira Woodruff. November 25 through December 15, 2007, Children's Theatre of Charlotte, Charlotte, VA
- Ramana's Garden (Music by Joan Cushing / Script and Lyrics by Kathleen Carroll and Joan Cushing). Based on true stories of children at an orphanage in India. Staged Reading with Band, July 16, 2010, Friends of Ramana's Garden

=== Theatre for Young Audiences (TYA) musicals ===
- Miss Nelson Is Missing!, adapted from the book by Harry Allard (author) and James Marshall (illustrator). November 10, 2001 through January 13, 2002, Imagination Stage, Bethesda, MD
- Brave Irene, adapted from the book by William Steig (author/illustrator). January 18 through February 23, 2003, Adventure Theatre, Glen Echo, MD
- Junie B. Jones & a Little Monkey Business!, adapted from books by Barbara Park (author) and Denise Brunkus (illustrator). July 1 through August 17, 2003, Imagination Stage, Bethesda, MD
- Miss Nelson Has a Field Day!, adapted from the book by Harry Allard (author) and James Marshall (illustrator). November 12, 2003 through January 11, 2004, Imagination Stage, Bethesda, MD
- Petite Rouge: A Cajun Red Riding Hood, adapted from the book by Mike Artell (author) and Jim Harris (illustrator). February 5 through April 3, 2005, Imagination Stage, Bethesda, MD
- Heidi (Music & Lyrics by Joan Cushing / Script-Book by Martha King de Silva), adapted from the book by Johanna Spyri. April 4 through May 24, 2009, Imagination Stage, Bethesda, MD
- Diary of a Worm, a Spider & a Fly, adapted from books by Doreen Cronin (author) and Harry Bliss (illustrator). Originally commissioned in August 2009, performed January/February 2011, Oregon Children's Theatre, Portland, OR
- George & Martha: Tons of Fun, based on the collection of stories by James Marshall (author and illustrator). April 9 through May 28, 2011, Imagination Stage, Bethesda, MD
- Ella's Big Chance: a Jazz Age Cinderella, adapted from the book written and illustrated by Shirley Hughes. December 4 through December 20, 2015, Children's Theatre of Charlotte, Charlotte, VA
- 101 Dalmatians (Music and Lyrics by Joan Cushing / Script-Book by Martha King de Silva), adapted from the book by Dodi DeSanto. November 19, 2014 through January 11, 2015, Imagination Stage co-opening with Children's Theatre of Charlotte
- Grace for President, adapted from the book by Kelly DiPucchio (author) and LeUyen Pham (illustrator). October 21 through November 6, 2016, Children's Theatre of Charlotte, Charlotte, VA
