= Barbara Park bibliography =

List of books written by Barbara Park

Barbara Park, an American author, wrote many children's books. She is most well known for her Junie B. Jones series of chapter books about a trouble-making schoolgirl. Park's first manuscript, Operation: Dump the Chump (1982), was accepted by the Random House imprint Alfred A. Knopf, Inc in 1981. It became her third book to be published after Knopf accepted her other manuscripts for Don't Make Me Smile (1981) and Skinnybones (1982). She then wrote two books targeted at an audience of young girls: Beanpole (1983) and Buddies (1985). These were followed by The Kid in the Red Jacket (1987). Park began writing sequels with the Skinnybones sequel Almost Starring Skinnybones (1988), followed by a sequel to Don't Make Me Smile called My Mother Got Married (And Other Disasters) (1989). She next wrote a trilogy of books, The Geek Chronicles (1990–1993).

Park published the first Junie B. Jones book in 1992 and continued writing them alongside her other projects. They were contrasted by more serious books released around the same time, Mick Harte Was Here (1995) about the death of a sibling, and The Graduation of Jake Moon (2000) about dealing with a loved one developing Alzheimer's disease. Park followed her Junie B. Jones series with the Junie B., First Grader books beginning in 2001. She also wrote two picture books, Psssst! It's Me...the Bogeyman (1998) and Ma! There's Nothing to Do Here! A Word from Your Baby-in-Waiting (2008). She continued writing Junie B. Jones until the final book was published in 2012, a year before her death.

== Junie B. Jones ==
=== Junie B. Jones ===
- Junie B. Jones and the Stupid Smelly Bus a.k.a. Junie B. Jones is On Her Way! (#1) (1992) (ISBN 978-0-679-82642-2)
  Junie B. starts her first day of kindergarten, but she refuses to go home because she is afraid of the school bus.
- Junie B. Jones and a Little Monkey Business (#2) (1993) (ISBN 978-0-679-83886-9)
  Junie B. gets a new baby brother, and she considers bringing him to school for pet day.
- Junie B. Jones and Her Big Fat Mouth (#3) (1993) (ISBN 978-0-679-84407-5)
  Junie B. tells her class that she has the most interesting job for Job Day, and has to come up with something to show them.
- Junie B. Jones and Some Sneaky Peeky Spying (#4) (1994) (ISBN 978-0-679-85101-1)
  Junie B. enjoys spying on people, but risks trouble by spying on her teacher.
- Junie B. Jones and the Yucky Blucky Fruitcake (#5) (1995) (ISBN 978-0-679-86694-7)
  Junie B. chooses a fruitcake as her prize in a carnival cakewalk, but it is not what she expected.
- Junie B. Jones and That Meanie Jim's Birthday (#6) (1996) (ISBN 978-0-679-86695-4)
  Junie B. is upset with Meanie Jim when he invites everyone in their classroom to his birthday party except for her.
- Junie B. Jones Loves Handsome Warren (#7) (1996) (ISBN 978-0-679-86696-1)
  Junie B. competes with her friends to win the affections of a new student, but she makes a bad first impression.
- Junie B. Jones Has a Monster Under Her Bed (#8) (1997) (ISBN 978-0-679-86697-8)
  Junie B. is afraid that there is a monster under her bed when she finds what she believes to be its drool on her pillow.
- Junie B. Jones Is Not a Crook (#9) (1997) (ISBN 978-0-679-88342-5)
  Someone took Junie B.'s new mittens, so she believes she is entitled to take a pen that she finds.
- Junie B. Jones Is a Party Animal (#10) (1997) (ISBN 978-0-679-88663-1)
  Junie B. has a sleepover with her friends Grace and Lucille at the mansion owned by Lucille's grandmother.
- Junie B. Jones Is a Beauty Shop Guy (#11) (1998) (ISBN 978-0-679-88931-1)
  Junie B. believes she has a calling to become a beauty shop worker, so she practices on her stuffed animals and then on herself.
- Junie B. Jones Smells Something Fishy (#12) (1998) (ISBN 978-0-679-89130-7)
  Junie B. is not allowed to take her dog to pet day at school, so she considers taking other animals.
- Junie B. Jones Is (Almost) a Flower Girl (#13) (1999) (ISBN 978-0-375-80038-2)
  Junie B.'s Aunt Flo is having a wedding, and Junie B. is upset that she is not the flower girl.
- Junie B. Jones And The Mushy Gushy Valentime (#14) (1999) (ISBN 978-0-375-80039-9)
  When Junie B. receives a special valentine on Valentine's Day, she tries to find out who in her class sent it.
- Junie B. Jones Has a Peep in Her Pocket (#15) (2000) (ISBN 978-0-375-80040-5)
  Junie B. goes on a field trip to a farm with her class, but she is upset that there is no gift shop.
- Junie B. Jones Is Captain Field Day (#16) (2001) (ISBN 978-0-375-80291-1)
  Junie B. is team captain for her class on field day, but they keep losing to another class.
- Junie B. Jones Is a Graduation Girl (#17) (2001) (ISBN 978-0-375-90292-5)
  Junie B. receives a white gown for her kindergarten graduation ceremony, but she takes it out of the box before she is supposed to and stains it.

=== Junie B., First Grader ===
- Junie B., First Grader (at last!) (#18) (2001) (ISBN 978-0-375-80293-5)
  Junie B. becomes a first grader, but she learns that she has vision problems.
- Junie B., First Grader: Boss of Lunch (#19) (2002) (ISBN 978-0-375-81517-1)
  Junie B. is excited about working in the school cafeteria.
- Junie B., First Grader: Toothless Wonder (#20) (2002) (ISBN 978-0-375-80295-9)
  Junie B. has a loose tooth and learns about the tooth fairy.
- Junie B., First Grader: Cheater Pants (#21) (2003) (ISBN 978-0-375-82301-5)
  Junie B. tries to justify her attempts to cheat on her homework and tests.
- Junie B., First Grader: One-Man Band (#22) (2003) (ISBN 978-0-375-82522-4)
  Junie B. performs a halftime show during the first grade kickball tournament.
- Junie B., First Grader: Shipwrecked (#23) (2004) (ISBN 978-0-375-82804-1)
  Junie B. is in a play about the voyages of Christopher Columbus.
- Junie B., First Grader: Boo...and I MEAN IT! (#24) (2004) (ISBN 978-0-375-82806-5)
  Junie B. is worried about monsters on Halloween.
- Junie B., First Grader: Jingle Bells, Batman Smells (P.S. So Does May) (#25) (2005) (ISBN 978-0-375-82808-9)
  Junie B. considers getting revenge on Tattletale May when she becomes May's secret Santa.
- Junie B., First Grader: Aloha-ha-ha! (#26) (2006) (ISBN 978-0-375-83403-5)
  Junie B. and her family go on vacation to Hawaii, and her teacher gives her a camera for the trip.
- Junie B., First Grader: Dumb Bunny! (#27) (2007) (ISBN 978-0-375-83809-5)
  Junie B. is forced to wear a bunny costume during an egg hunt.
- Junie B., First Grader: Turkeys We Have Loved and Eaten (and Other Thankful Stuff) (#28) (2013) (ISBN 978-0-375-87063-7)
  Junie B. and her class create a list of things they are thankful for on Thanksgiving.

=== Companion books ===
- Top-Secret Personal Beeswax: A Journal by Junie B. (and Me!) (2003) (ISBN 978-0-375-82375-6)
  A journal used by Junie B., with spaces for readers to include their own additions
- Junie B's Essential Survival Guide to School (2009) (ISBN 978-0-375-83811-8)
  Junie B. tells the reader what she learned about attending school, with spaces for the readers to include their own additions.
- Junie B. Jones: These Puzzles Hurt My Brain! Book (2011) (ISBN 978-0-375-87123-8)
  A puzzle book featuring Junie B.
- Junie B. My Valentime (2013) (ISBN 978-0-385-37302-9)
  A book about Valentine's Day written by Junie B., including a set of Valentine's Day cards

== Novels ==
- Don't Make Me Smile (1981) (ISBN 978-0-394-84978-2)
  Charlie Hickle navigates his parents' divorce.
- Skinnybones (1982) (ISBN 978-0-394-84988-1)
  Alex Frankovitch is a skinny class clown who competes with his more athletic rival T.J. for their peers' approval. Park released an updated edition in 1997 to replace outdated pop culture references.
- Operation: Dump the Chump (1982) (ISBN 978-0-394-95179-9)
  Oscar Winkle tries to get his annoying younger brother Robert sent away for the summer as a live-in helper for their elderly neighbors, but Oscar accidentally gets himself sent instead. Although this was Park's third book to be published, it was the first manuscript she wrote.
- Beanpole (1983) (ISBN 978-0-394-85811-1)
  Lillian Iris Pinkerton, the tallest girl in her class, wants to join the Pom Squad.
- Buddies (1985) (ISBN 978-0-394-86934-6)
  Dinah Feeney goes to summer camp where she tries to reinvent herself as a popular kid, but she regrets being cruel to a less popular girl.
- The Kid in the Red Jacket (1987) (ISBN 978-0-8000-5363-5)
  Howard Jeeter is a ten-year-old boy who moves across the United States and tries to adjust as a new student, but is hindered by a six-year-old girl who wants to be his friend.
- Almost Starring Skinnybones (1988) (ISBN 978-0-394-89831-5)
  The sequel to Skinnybones. Alex Frankovitch becomes an actor in a commercial but is embarrassed by how it turns out.
- My Mother Got Married (And Other Disasters) (1989) (ISBN 978-0-394-82149-8)
  The sequel to Don't Make Me Smile. After adjusting to his parents' divorce, Charlie Hickle's mother remarries and he gets two stepsiblings.
- Maxie, Rosie, and Earl – Partners in Grime (1990) (ISBN 978-0-679-80212-9)
  The first book of the Geek Chronicles trilogy. Maxie Zuckerman, Rosie Swanson, and Earl Wilber meet after each is sent to the principal's office.
- Rosie Swanson: Fourth-Grade Geek for President (1991) (ISBN 978-0-679-82094-9)
  The second book of the Geek Chronicles trilogy. Rosie Swanson runs for class president, campaigning as a typical student against the popular kids.
- Dear God, Help!!! Love, Earl (1993) (ISBN 978-0-679-83431-1)
  The third book of the Geek Chronicles trilogy. Earl Wilber is victimized by a bully, so he fakes his death when the bully hits him.
- Mick Harte Was Here (1995) (ISBN 978-0-679-87088-3)
  Phoebe Harte and her parents cope with the death of her brother Mick in a bicycle accident. Park wrote the book after a child was killed in such an accident in her neighborhood.
- The Graduation of Jake Moon (2000) (ISBN 978-1-4046-2950-9)
  Jake Moon watches as his grandfather's Alzheimer's disease become more severe.

== Picture books ==
- Psssst! It's Me...the Bogeyman (1998) (ISBN 978-0-689-81667-3)
  The Bogeyman explains why he is innocent. The book was illustrated by Stephen Kroninger.
- Ma! There's Nothing to Do Here! A Word from Your Baby-in-Waiting (2008) (ISBN 978-0-375-83852-1)
  A fetus complains about boredom while waiting to be born. The book was illustrated by Viviana Garofoli.
