= The Stray Dog (Simont book) =

2000 children's book by Marc Simont

First edition (publ. HarperCollins)

The Stray Dog is a 2000 children's picture book by Marc Simont, the recipient of the Caldecott Honor in 2001. Published by Harper Collins Publishers, this was Simont's second Caldecott Honor, after The Happy Day by Ruth Krauss in 1950.

== Plot ==
A family of four meets a stray dog while having a picnic in the park. The two kids name the dog Willy and ask their parents if they can keep him. Unfortunately, their parents say no. During the next week, every member of the family keeps on thinking about Willy. When Saturday comes, they decide to go on another picnic to see if the stray dog will appear again. When they see a dogcatcher chase after the dog, they try to save him. When they catch up to him, the dogcatcher says that the dog doesn't belong to anyone. The kids tell him that the dog does belong to them by saying that the boy's belt was the dog's collar and the girl's hair ribbon was his leash. The dogcatcher is satisfied and leaves.

== Reception ==
Steve Barancik of Best Children's Books has written that the story is heartwarming, and that the ending reminded him of that of Dr. Seuss's classic children's picture book, Horton Hatches the Egg. The book has won several awards, including ALA Notable Children’s Book, Boston Globe-Horn Book Award, and Caldecott Honor Book.
