= Gila Monsters Meet You at the Airport =

1980 children's book by Marjorie Weinman Sharmat

- Author: Marjorie W. Sharmat
- Original title: None
- Translator: None
- Illustrator: Byron Barton
- Language: English
- Series: None
- Genre: children's book, picture book
- Publisher: Simon and Schuster
- Publication date: 1980
- Publication place: United States
- ISBN: 0-689-71383-5

Gila Monsters Meet You at the Airport (ISBN 0-689-71383-5) is a 1980 children's book by Marjorie Sharmat, and illustrated by Byron Barton. It was published by Simon and Schuster. It was featured on episode 8 of the children's show Reading Rainbow.

== See also ==
- Marjorie W. Sharmat
- Byron Barton
- Reading Rainbow
