= Barbara Park =

American author (1947–2013)

- Born: Barbara Lynne Tidswell; April 21, 1947; Mount Holly, New Jersey, U.S.
- Died: November 15, 2013 (aged 66); Scottsdale, Arizona, U.S.
- Occupation: Author
- Spouse: Richard A. Park (m. 1969)
- Children: 2
- Writing career
- Genre: Children's literature
- Notable work: Junie B. Jones

Barbara Lynne Park (née Tidswell; April 21, 1947 – November 15, 2013) was an American author of children's books. She is most well known for writing the Junie B. Jones series of chapter books. She has also written several middle grade and young adult books, including Skinnybones (1982), Mick Harte Was Here (1995), and The Graduation of Jake Moon (2000). Park's works frequently visit themes of familial relationships and children's experiences in school, and she based characters on her children and her own childhood memories. Park did not allow adaptations of her works except for stage plays.

Originally intending to become a high school teacher, Park abandoned the idea after an unpleasant semester as a student teacher. She moved across the country as her husband traveled for Air Force training before they settled in Arizona. Her first manuscript, Skinnybones, was accepted by Alfred A. Knopf, Inc in 1981. Don't Make Me Smile, another manuscript she had prepared, became her first book published by Knopf the same year. She began writing Junie B. Jones in 1992, which proved highly popular, and she continued writing the series for the rest of her life. She became active in advocacy for the use of bicycle helmets after a child died of a bicycle accident in her neighborhood in 1993, and this made up the plot of Mick Harte Was Here. She died of ovarian cancer in 2013.

== Childhood ==
Barbara Lynne Tidswell was born in Mount Holly, New Jersey, on April 21, 1947. Her father was Brooke Tidswell Jr, a banker, the local board of education president, and the owner of a home improvement store. Her mother, Doris Tidswell, was a high school library secretary. She had a brother, also named Brooke, who was two years older than her; he went on to become mayor of Mount Holly. Tidswell described her younger self as a tattletale—especially against her brother—and would tell on people so they learn their lesson "for their own good". She hoped to be on the television show The Mickey Mouse Club. Each year, her family took a two-week summer trip to Long Beach Island. She later spoke positively about her childhood. As a child, she enjoyed the Thornton W. Burgess story collection Burgess Bird for Children and the Nancy Drew books. She more often read comics, such as Richie Rich, Archie Comics, and Uncle Scrooge.

As a teenager, Tidswell moved away from comics and read books more frequently. Reading The Catcher in the Rye redefined how she saw literature and impressed on her how to present a character like Holden Caulfield. Tidswell also considered this a formative time in her life politically. As major events such as the Vietnam War and the Civil rights movement took place, she felt obligated to stay up to date so she could join her friends' political discussions. Reflecting on her political beliefs, she said that she was "all over the board" with her opinions "depending on which spin doctor sounded the most intelligent". Tidswell graduated from Rancocas Valley Regional High School in 1965.

== University and marriage ==
Tidswell began her post-secondary education at Rider College in Lawrence Township, New Jersey, which she attended for two years. She did not take interest in the school's social environment or clubs, and she returned to her parents' home each weekend. Unhappy with how she was spending her time, she transferred to The University of Alabama so she could experience a new environment. She was taken aback by the much larger campus than she was accustomed to at her small college. By this time, she was decidedly liberal in her beliefs and felt uncomfortable in a more conservative locality. Although she had an active social life, she did not get much enjoyment from university life. While in college, she had her ears pierced by someone living down the hall while she was in college, later describing herself as an "idiot" for doing this.

Tidswell's intention was to become a high school history teacher, In her final semester at Alabama University, Tidswell worked in a seventh-grade history and geography classroom as a student teacher. She was given no guidance by the teacher she was training under and found the experience unpleasant. In one instance, Tidswell was responsible for the class on her own; the classroom became rowdy while she was running a geography bee, and she was too afraid to respond when the office asked about the noise over the intercom. After her experiences as a student teacher, she lost interest in the profession.

Tidswell graduated in 1969 with a bachelor's degree. (Note: Park's degree has been described as a bachelor's of education or of history and political science.) She was introduced to Richard Park by her roommate in their final year at The University of Alabama, and they became friends before starting a romantic relationship. They married immediately after graduating so she could accompany him when he joined the U.S. Air Force. They moved across the country several times throughout his career. During this time, they had two sons together, Steven and David. Richard left the Air Force in 1974, and they settled in Arizona. She raised their children while Richard became a real estate broker.

== Writing career ==
=== Entering the writing industry ===
Isn't it ridiculous the way some people react to getting older? Facelifts, wigs, wrinkle creams, etc... There's no doubt about it... I really admire the way you've just let yourself go.

— Barbara Park, in a Hallmark Card as her first published work

Barbara Park thought about seeking a profession once her children were both in school. She began writing as a way to express her sense of humor. She decided that she would try writing for two years, and if it did not work for her, then she would get a master's degree in counseling. After having her work rejected by newspapers and magazines, she earned her first sale when Hallmark Cards published her caption in a greeting card. She realized that she wanted to write children's book after reading Tales of a Fourth Grade Nothing by Judy Blume.

The first children's book Park sent to publishers was Operation: Dump the Chump. She wrote the manuscript in three months, writing on a typewriter each morning at a card table in her bedroom. She then purchased a copy of the Writer's Market for help with publishing the book. While she was waiting for publishers to respond, she began writing two more books: Skinnybones and Don't Make Me Smile. Don't Make Me Smile addressed divorce from the perspective of a 10-year-old boy whose parents were separating. She decided that this was an important topic to write about after her friend, who was going through a divorce, expressed a wish that there were more books like this to help children cope with it.

Operation: Dump the Chump was accepted by Alfred A. Knopf, Inc. of Random House after three other publishers passed on it, and she entered into a three-book deal with them. It was noticed by the publisher's assistant editor Lori Mack, who ensured that it was selected for publication. Park was then contacted by editor in chief Pat Ross, who told her she had "a home" at the publisher. Don't Make Me Smile was released in 1981, the first of her books published by Knopf. Knopf published Operation: Dump the Chump and Skinnybones in 1982.

=== The Geek Chronicles and Junie B. Jones ===
After her first books were established, Park wrote two with girls in mind as the main audience. She published Beanpole, about a girl in middle school, in 1983. She then published Buddies in 1985, which follows a young girl as she discovers that her actions can hurt others. Park received the Texas Bluebonnet Award the same year, which helped her develop a reputation in the literary industry. After these two books, she decided to write without considering the gender of her readers. Park wrote The Kid in the Red Jacket about being a new student and published it in 1987. Following the success of Skinnybones, she published a sequel, Almost Starring Skinnybones, in 1988. She then wrote another sequel for one of her books in 1989, following Don't Make Me Smile with My Mother Got Married (And Other Disasters) to show the child of divorced parents learning to accept step-siblings. Park began a new series of three books, The Geek Chronicles, in 1990. The first was Maxie, Rosie, and Earl—Partners in Grime, which was her first book written from third-person perspective. The second was Rosie Swanson: Fourth-Grade Geek for President in 1991, a political satire about running for class president to challenge more popular kids. Finally, she wrote Dear God, HELP!!! Love, Earl about bullying in 1993.

Park began publishing the Junie B. Jones chapter books in 1992, starting with Junie B. Jones and the Stupid Smelly Bus. Unlike her previous works, this was targeted at younger children. It was part of Random House's First Stepping Stones line of chapter books, for which she was invited to write four books. The books featured a vocal five-year-old girl. Junie B. Jones resented her middle name because Park disliked her own name as a child; her initials, B.L.T., bothered her for their similarity to the BLT sandwich. Junie B. Jones became Park's most well-known work, and the series was controversial and frequently challenged because of the titular character's poor behavior and bad grammar. She worked with the illustrator Denise Brunkus. Because of the success of Junie B. Jones, she decided not to write any more Geek Chronicles books after she finished Dear God, HELP!!! Love, Earl.

=== Mick Harte Was Here ===
Park was deeply affected by the death of a child in her neighborhood in 1993, when he was struck by a school bus while riding home from school on a bicycle. She later saw the bicycle laying in the road—an image that ingrained itself into her mind. She began writing Mick Harte Was Here as an outlet for her thoughts. She worked on the book over the following two years, but she found it difficult to write it at the same time as the more lighthearted Junie B. Jones series. Mick Harte Was Here was published as a novel in 1995. She considered this her favorite of the books she wrote. It was told from the perspective of a child whose sibling had died, and encouraged children to wear helmets when riding a bicycle. Park also lobbied the Arizona State Legislature to pass a bicycle helmet law for children, but it rejected her proposal.

Park had doubts about the potential of Mick Harte Was Here, believing that the more serious subject matter would turn away her usual audience, and she asked for a smaller advance than she usually took, but she went on her first book tour after it was well received among the publishing staff. She worked with Bell Helmets, which gave away bicycle helmets to those attending tour events. Mick Harte Was Here was well-received, but it was challenged for using profane phrases such as "damn", "fart", and "I swear to God".

=== Later works ===
For the rest of the 1990s, Park focused primarily on writing further Junie B. Jones books. She then wrote a picture book with a target audience of older children, Psssst! It's Me... the Bogeyman, in 1998. She published a new edition of Skinnybones in 1997, replacing references that had become outdated. Park returned to more serious subject matter in 2000 with a story about Alzheimer's disease, The Graduation of Jake Moon, that followed a teenage boy as his grandfather was increasingly affected by the disease. Park's editor at Random House, Anne Schwartz, briefly left the company to start her own publisher, Atheneum, and Park published The Graduation of Jake Moon with Schwartz.

After The Graduation of Jake Moon, Park shifted to writing Junie B. Jones full time. Park moved the character of Junie B. Jones from kindergarten in 2001 with the eighteenth book of the series: Junie B., First Grader (at last!). She also published Junie B. Jones Personal Beeswax (An Interactive Journal) in 2003. She wrote another picture book, Ma! There's Nothing to Do Here! A Word from Your Baby-in-Waiting, told from the perspective of a bored fetus waiting to be born, in 2008. She wrote her final Junie B. Jones book, Turkeys We Have Loved and Eaten (and Other Thankful Stuff), in 2012.

== Later life and death ==
Park was private and did not seek celebrity status, though she sometimes met children through the Make-A-Wish Foundation. Over the course of her career, she won many Parents' Choice and Students' Choice awards. Park refused to allow adaptations of her work outside of stage plays because she wished to be involved with any adaptation personally, and plays were the only type she felt she had time for. She licensed Junie B. Jones to Imagination Stage and TheatreWorksUSA, where she participated in creating stage adaptations of her stories. She once tried to have Beanpole turned into a television series, but this was unsuccessful.

Park's sons Steven and David went on to become a United States Border Patrol agent and a lawyer, respectively, and she became a grandmother with the birth of David's son in 2005. Park was afflicted with ovarian cancer, which she had for approximately seven years. She and her husband founded a nonprofit for women with ovarian cancer, Sisters in Survival. She died on November 15, 2013, in Scottsdale, Arizona.

== Style and themes ==
Park drew from her experiences as a mother and her semester as a student teacher when describing children and classroom environments, and she used memories of her own mindset as a child when developing the personalities of her characters. The children in her first book, Operation: Dump the Chump, were directly inspired by her two sons. Park's portrayal of parents in her works reflected her own family life. She was raised in a supportive home and never saw her parents fight, and this held true for all of her characters. Family relationships are a common theme across most of Park's works.

As part of her writing process, Park kept paper, pencil, and flashlight on her nightstand to write down ideas in the middle of the night. She did not write out detailed plots before she began writing, instead working "by the seat of [her] pants". She found the initial writing process difficult and got more enjoyment on working through rewrites and refinement. Park's primary literary influences were J.D. Salinger and Judy Blume. Blume in turn complimented the Junie B. Jones series and has sometimes been mistaken as their writer because of her similar style and her name's resemblance to Junie B.

Park developed a reputation for dealing with serious subject matter in a lighthearted way. Across her books, characters frequently find themselves in embarrassing situations around other children. In books like Don't Make Me Smile and The Kid in the Red Jacket, she portrayed children expressing their worries by talking through them. She rejected the idea that children's books must always teach morals, instead seeing simple entertainment as a legitimate purpose for a children's book. When the child characters do learn from their actions, Park has them do so on their own instead of having an adult explain things to them.

== See also ==
- Barbara Park bibliography
