= Nate the Great =

31 children's detective stories by Marjorie Weinman Sharmat

First book in the series

Nate the Great is a series of 31 children's detective stories written by Marjorie W. Sharmat and featuring the boy detective Nate the Great. Sharmat and the illustrator Marc Simont inaugurated the series in 1972 with Nate the Great, a 60-page book published by Coward, McCann & Geoghegan. Simont illustrated the first twenty books, to 1998; the last ten were illustrated by Martha Weston, Jody Wheeler, or Olga and Aleksey Ivanov "in the style of Marc Simont". Some of the titles were jointly written with Sharmat's sister Rosalind Weinman, husband Mitchell Sharmat or sons Craig Sharmat and Andrew Sharmat. Regarding the series, Marjorie Sharmat has called her husband Mitchell "always my first editor, and it's been a very happy collaboration".

Nate the Great Goes Undercover was adapted as a television program and won the Los Angeles International Children's Film Festival Award. The New York Public Library named Nate the Great Saves the King of Sweden (1997, number 19) one of its "100 Titles for Reading and Sharing".

Marjorie Weinman Sharmat's husband, Mitchell Sharmat, died in 2011 and her sister, Rosalind Weinman, in 2006. With Marjorie Weinman Sharmat's death in 2019, Andrew Sharmat has continued writing the series with Nate the Great and the Earth Day Robot (2021).

== Characters ==
Nate is a detective, a child version of Sam Spade who wears a 'Sherlock Holmes-style deerstalker hat' (the idea of illustrator Marc Simont) and loves pancakes. He solves crimes with his dog, Sludge, introduced in the second case, Nate the Great goes Undercover (1974).

The character Nate was "inspired" by Nathan Weinman, father of Marjorie Sharmat, who had previously "featured" her mother and sister in a novel. She "named the other characters in the [first] book after" other relatives: Annie, Rosamond, and Harry after mother Anne, sister Rosalind, and uncle Harry.

There are several recurring characters besides Nate and his dog Sludge.

- Annie, owner of the fierce dog Fang. She is an African-American girl and one of Nate’s closest friends. She also has a little brother named Harry.
- Oliver, described as a pest because he likes to follow people around.
- Rosamond, strange owner of four cats (Super Hex, Big Hex, Plain Hex, and Little Hex.) It is revealed later on in the series that she has a crush on Nate.
- Esmeralda, described as wise
- Finley and Pip, occasional adversaries; Finley is described as talking too much, while Pip is described as not talking a lot
- Claude, described as a friend who is "always losing things"

The 2002 volume (number 22) Nate the Great, San Francisco Detective establishes that Nate the Great and the girl detective Olivia Sharp are cousins. She is the heroine of a 1989–1991 series of four books sometimes called Olivia Sharp, Agent for Secrets, written by Marjorie and Mitchell Sharmat and illustrated by Denise Brunkus.

=== Rosamond and Emily the Strange origin controversy ===
Rosamond (from Nate the Great) on the left and Emily (from Emily the Strange) on the right

The second book in the series Nate the Great Goes Undercover (1974) features a girl named Rosamond. She has long black hair and a short black dress, white mary jane shoes, four black cats of different sizes, and she is frequently described as "strange".

Emily the Strange is an illustrated fictional character featured in several comic books, graphic novels and in various merchandise and clothing lines. Emily has been considered by some to be a "rip off" of Rosamond. In her first illustration from 1991 Emily has a similar pose, long black hair, and is accompanied by her four black cats. Rosamond's illustration in Nate the Great Goes Undercover is accompanied by the text, "Rosamond did not look hungry or sleepy. She looked like she always looks. Strange." The first Emily the Strange design says: "Emily did not look tired or happy. She looked like she always looks. Strange."

When Rosamond's creators, Marjorie Sharmat and Marc Simont, allegedly began contacting companies who had contracts related to Emily the Strange and urged them to drop their relationships with Cosmic Debris, Cosmic Debris sued Sharmat and Simont. Sharmat and Simont counter-sued. "Emily the Strange, like Rosamond, is a young girl in a short dress, black tights, and Mary Jane shoes. Emily, like Rosamond, has long dark hair with square-cut bangs. Emily, like Rosamond, is typically attended by four black cats. Emily, like Rosamond, is described as being strange and has a fascination with dark themes," alleged the complaint.

Cosmic Debris contended that Emily and Rosamond both drew from a tradition of similar characters including Vampira and Wednesday Addams, and argued that while the text of the initial Emily illustration was nearly identical with Sharmat's text, that illustration had been withdrawn in 1998 and the statute of limitations had therefore run out.

On August 12, 2009, creator of Emily the Strange and the creators of Nate the Great jointly announced an agreement resolving all disputes between them. Each side agreed to give up all claims against the other as part of their settlement. "We recognize that Emily and Rosamond are both unique and original characters, and we are pleased that we were able to resolve this dispute," said Marjorie Sharmat and Marc Simont. "We wish Rob, Cosmic Debris, Emily and her fans all the very best."

== Series ==
The first twenty volumes were illustrated by Marc Simont.

Number	Title	Published	Summary	Notes
1	Nate the Great	1972	Nate's friend Annie has lost a picture of her dog Fang. While on the case Nate and Annie go to Rosamond's house and discover that she has lost her cat, Super Hex.	First appearance of Nate, Annie and her dog Fang, Harry (Annie's brother), Rosamond and her four cats (Super Hex, Big Hex, Little Hex, Plain Hex)
2	Nate the Great Goes Undercover	1974	Nate is on the case to find who has been tipping over and snatching Oliver's garbage outside every night.	First appearance of Oliver, Esmeralda, and Sludge (Nate's new dog). Adapted as a television program and won the Los Angeles International Children's Film Festival Award
3	Nate the Great and the Lost List	1975	Nate ends his vacation early to take a new case and find Claude's lost grocery list.	First appearance of Claude.
4	Nate the Great and the Phony Clue	1977	Nate's detective skills are put to the test on a case with a deadline and clues that seem to be trying to stop him from solving it.	First appearance of Finley and Pip.
5	Nate the Great and the Sticky Case	1978	Nate takes on the case of finding Claude's favorite sticker when it goes missing.	
6	Nate the Great and the Missing Key	1981	Nate is annoyed but determined to help Annie find her house key so she can continue planning a party for Fang.	
7	Nate the Great and the Snowy Trail	1983	Nate accepts a request to find a birthday gift from Rosamond, which proves difficult since she won't even tell him what it looks like.	
8	Nate the Great and the Fishy Prize	1985	Nate wants to enter Sludge into a contest for finding the smartest pet, but it cannot happen because the prize goes missing.	
9	Nate the Great Stalks Stupidweed	1986	Nate goes out to search for a special weed that Oliver lost after purchasing it from Rosamond's plant sale.	
10	Nate the Great and the Boring Beach Bag	1987	Nate's trip to the beach is interrupted when Oliver asks for his help in finding his beach bag.	
11	Nate the Great and the Halloween Hunt	1989	Nate has to help Rosamond find one of her black cats in the dead of Halloween night.	
12	Nate the Great Goes Down in the Dumps	1989	Nate's search for Rosamond's money box takes him to the depths of the dumpster.	
13	Nate the Great and the Musical Note	1990	Nate is hit with a case with a deadline, his only clue being a musical note.	written with son Craig Sharmat
14	Nate the Great and the Stolen Base	1992	Nate is part of the neighborhood baseball team, but coach Rosamond cancels practice because the second base is missing. With Oliver tagging along, Nate goes out to search for his plastic octopus that serves as the base.	
15	Nate the Great and the Pillowcase	1993	Nate takes on an all-nighter case in searching for Rosamond's pillowcase.	written with sister Rosalind Weinman (Note: According to Henneman (2002), sister Rosalind Weinman "helped pen several titles" in the series.)
16	Nate the Great and the Mushy Valentine	1994	Nate learns that Sludge was given a Valentine, one which Nate despises because of its mushiness. So Nate sets out to find out who is Sludge's secret admirer.	
17	Nate the Great and the Tardy Tortoise	1995	Nate is captivated by a tortoise and decides to follow it to see if it slowly makes its way back to its owner.	written with Craig Sharmat
18	Nate the Great and the Crunchy Christmas	1996	Nate is forced to search for Fang's Christmas mail.	written with Craig Sharmat
19	Nate the Great Saves the King of Sweden	1997	Nate faces the challenge of helping Rosamond find a lost item in another country. Moreover, his reputation is at stake as she threatens to ask the king of Sweden to help if he can't.	
20	Nate the Great and Me: The Case of the Fleeing Fang	1998	Nate is surprised by a party from his friends to celebrate his service in solving their mysteries. But the party is put on hold because Fang is missing. So Nate invites the reader to join him in the search, sharing his tips and advice for being a detective.	

The following eleven volumes are chapter books with illustrations "in the style of Marc Simont".

Number	Title	Published	Summary	Notes
21	Nate the Great and the Monster Mess	1999	Nate is given a rare case from his mom in finding the recipe for his favorite monster-shaped cookies.	Illustrated by Martha Weston†
22	Nate the Great, San Francisco Detective	1999	Nate takes a trip to San Francisco to visit his cousin and fellow detective Olivia Sharp. She enlists his help in searching for a joke book that supposedly will stop the world from ending.	With husband Mitchell Sharmat, illus. Weston†
23	Nate the Great and the Big Sniff	2001	Nate's latest case may prove to be his most worrisome one yet: finding Sludge!	With Mitchell Sharmat, illus. Weston†
24	Nate the Great on the Owl Express	2003	Nate visits Olivia once more, who is distraught because she believes someone is after her pet owl Hoot. Together, while traveling by train, they move car by car to figure out whooo wishes Hoot harm.	With Mitchell Sharmat, illus. Weston†
25	Nate the Great Talks Turkey	2007	Nate goes out to search for a giant turkey; with Claude, Sludge, and Olivia in similar pursuits.	With Mitchell Sharmat, illus. Jody Wheeler‡
26	Nate the Great and the Hungry Book Club	2009	Nate temporarily joins Rosamond's book club to discover the truth behind a monster that is eating pages from the club's books.	With Mitchell Sharmat, illus. Wheeler‡
27	Nate the Great, Where Are You?	2015	Nate decides to take a day off from solving mysteries, but everyone is calling for his help still. Will Nate be able to find some rest, or will his sleuthing instincts get the better of him?	With Mitchell Sharmat, illus. Wheeler‡
28	Nate the Great and the Missing Birthday Snake	2018	Nate has to face his fears to find a missing snake in time for a birthday party organized for Rosamond's cousin.	With son Andrew Sharmat, illus. Wheeler‡
29	Nate the Great and the Wandering Word	2019	Nate joins Rosamond and Esmeralda in searching for a pink slip of paper that holds the word Esmeralda wants to name Rosamond's pet concert.	With Andrew Sharmat, illus. Wheeler‡
30	Nate the Great and the Earth Day Robot	2021	Nate is at school and a cleaning robot goes missing. He searches class to class to find it.	Written by Andrew Sharmat, illus. Olga and Aleksey Ivanovᚬ (first Nate the Great book written after Marjorie Weinman Sharmat died in 2019)
31	Nate the Great and the Missing Tomatoes	2022	At a competition to grow the best vegetables some of Rosamond’s tomatoes go missing and Nate and Sludge are called to investigate.	Written by Andrew Sharmat, illus. Olga and Aleksey Ivanovᚬ

† "illustrations by Martha Weston in the style of Marc Simont"
‡ "illustrations by Jody Wheeler in the style of Marc Simont"
ᚬ "illustrated by Olga and Aleksey Ivanov in the style of Marc Simont"

== Olivia Sharp ==
Olivia Sharp is a girl detective and Nate's cousin. Her four stories were written by the husband-and-wife team Mitchell and Marjorie Sharmat, illustrated by Denise Brunkus, and published by Delacorte Press. The titles are sometimes styled Olivia Sharp: The Pizza Monster, and so on.

- The Pizza Monster (1989)
- The Princess of the Fillmore Street School (1989)
- The Sly Spy (1990)
- The Green Toenails Gang (1991)

In 2008 and 2009 Ravensburger Buchverlag published German-language editions of the first three Olivia Sharp books with new illustrations by Franziska Harvey. All three titles begin with the name of the German heroine, "Bella Bond", and the 2011 omnibus edition of three stories is Bella Bond – Agentin für Geheimnisse; literally "Agent for Secrets".

== Adaptations ==
- Nate the Great Goes Undercover was adapted as a television program and won the Los Angeles International Children's Film Festival Award.
- In 2006, PBS and Animagic were developing a 40-episode animated series based on Nate the Great. 6 weeks into production the series was cancelled as an investor pulling out resulted in the animation studio laying off its entire staff.
- A Nate the Great musical by TheatreworksUSA ran in the 2007–2008 and 2008–2009 seasons.

== Popular culture ==
- Nate the Great is mentioned in a few episodes of Between the Lions.
- Nate the Great goes Undercover and the whole series is featured in the Reading Rainbow season 2 episode, "Mystery on the Docks", in the Book Reviews ("But you don't have to take my word for it") segment at the end.
- Nate the Great was featured on 28 million Cheerios boxes to promote children's literacy.
