= Byron Barton =

American author and illustrator (1930–2023)

- Born: Byron Vartanian; September 8, 1930; Pawtucket, Rhode Island, U.S.
- Died: June 3, 2023 (aged 92); Lakewood Ranch, Florida, U.S.

Byron Barton (September 8, 1930 – June 3, 2023) was an American writer and illustrator of children's picture books. His works received six ALA Notable Book Awards, five SLJ Best Books of the Year selections, and two Reading Rainbow picks.

== Personal life and education ==
Barton, whose birth name was Byron Vartanian, was born on "September 8, 1930 in Pawtucket, Rhode Island to Toros and Elizabeth Vartanian." He moved with his family to Los Angeles while he was in grade school, and there, he developed his interest in art, later attending Los Angeles City College. In 1950, he received a scholarship to study at Chouinard Art Institute (CAI), though he was unable to immediately attend due to being drafted into the Korean War. After being discharged, Barton returned to CAI, completing his studies in 1956.

Barton died at his home in Lakewood Ranch, Florida on June 3, 2023, at the age of 92.

== Career ==
Following the completion of his studies at the Chouinard Art Institute in 1956, Barton moved to New York City and began working as an ad designer and animator for CBS.

The first book he illustrated, Constance C. Green's A Girl Called Al, was published in 1969. Two years later, he published his first self-authored book, Elephant. Barton went on to write and author many more books, working with authors such as Russell Hoban, Jack Prelutsky, Marjorie W. Sharmat, and Seymour Simon. His works have received six ALA Notable Book Awards, five SLJ Best Books of the Year selections, and two Reading Rainbow picks. One of his books, Where's Al, was a New York Times Best Illustrated Children’s Books selection. His last book, My House, was published in 2016.

== Awards and honors ==
Barton's works have received six ALA Notable Book Awards and five SLJ Best Books of the Year selections. One of his books, Where's Al, was a New York Times Best Illustrated Children’s Books selection.

Two books Barton illustrated were featured on Reading Rainbow: Charlotte Pomerantz's The Tamarindo Puppy and Other Poems (1985) and Diane Siebert's Truck Song (1990).

The Horn Book Magazine included six of his books on their lists of the best picture books of the year: Machines at Work (1987); I Want To Be An Astronaut (1988); Bones, Bones Dinosaur Bones (1999); My Car (2001); My Bus (2014); and My Bike (2015).

Publishers Weekly included My Car on their list of the best picture books of 2001. The following year, the Association for Library Service to Children (ALSC) included it on their list of Notable Children's Books.

School Library Journal named My Bus one of the best picture books of 2014.

== Selected works ==
- 1972, Where's Al?
- 1973, Buzz Buzz Buzz
- 1974, Harry Is a Scaredy-Cat
- 1974 Jack and Fred
- 1975, Hester
- 1976, Bullfrog Grows Up (illustrator)
- 1977, Bullfrog Builds a House (illustrator)
- 1978, Arthur's New Power (illustrator)
- 1979, Wheels
- 1980, Good Morning, Chick (illustrator)
- 1980, Gila Monsters Meet You at the Airport (illustrator)
- 1981, Building a House
- 1981, Jump, Frog, Jump (illustrator)
- 1982, Airport
- 1984, Truck Song (illustrator)
- 1986, Boats
- 1986, Trucks
- 1986, Trains
- 1986, Planes
- 1987, Machines at Work
- 1988, I Want to Be an Astronaut
- 1989, Dinosaurs, Dinosaurs
- 1990, Bones, Bones, Dinosaur Bones
- 1991, The Three Bears
- 1993, The Little Red Hen
- 1995, The Wee Little Woman
- 1996, Big Machines (illustrator)
- 1996, Tools
- 2001, My Car
- 2014, My Bus
- 2015, My Bike
- 2016, My House
