= Academy of the Holy Cross =

College preparatory school in Maryland, U.S.

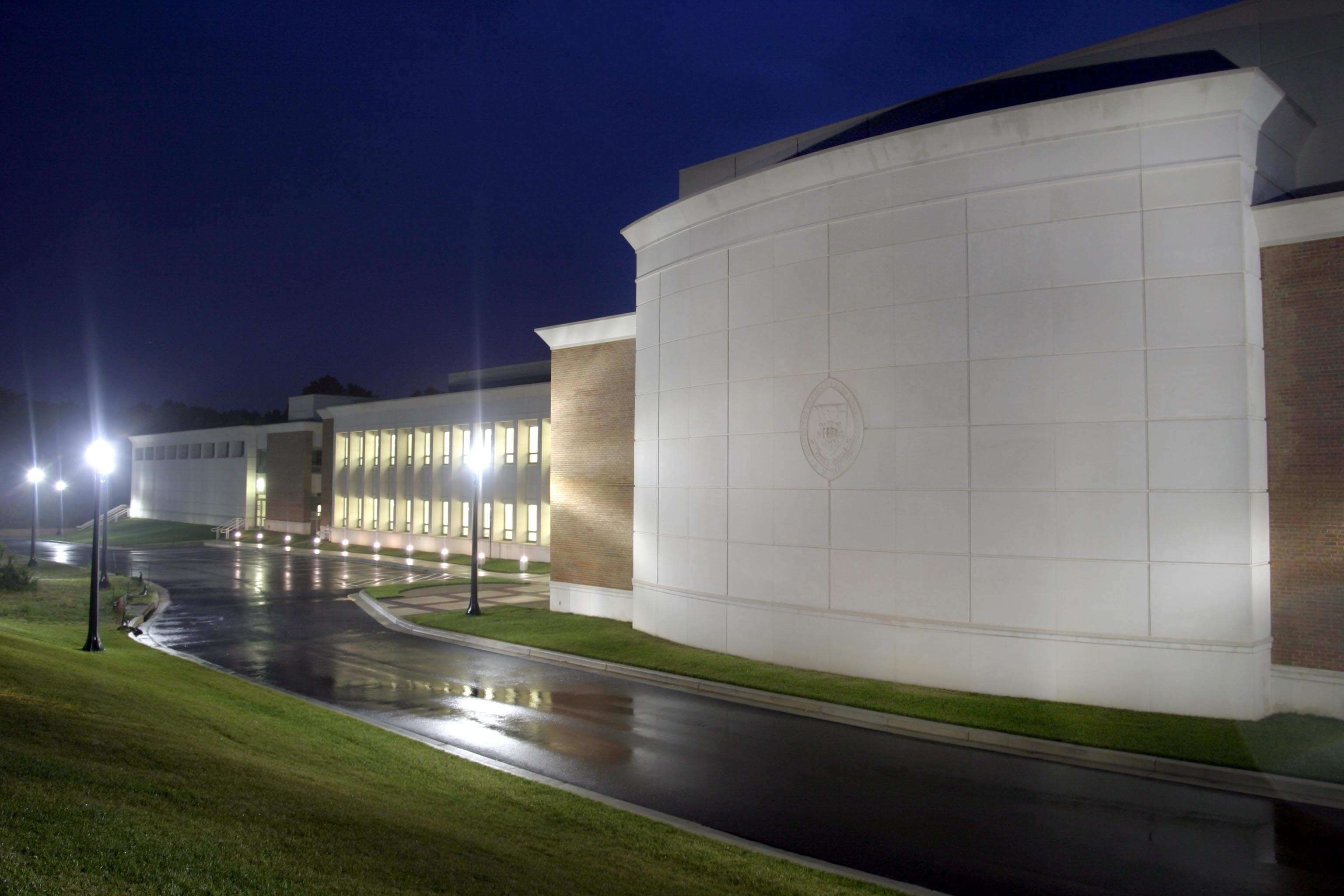

Location
- 4920 Strathmore Avenue; Kensington, Maryland 20895; United States; 39°2′0″N 77°5′53″W

Information
- Type: Private, College Preparatory
- Motto: Courage, compassion, and scholarship
- Religious affiliations: Roman Catholic (Sisters of the Holy Cross)
- Established: 1868
- School district: Archdiocese of Washington Catholic Schools
- CEEB code: 210678
- President: Emily Kasof
- Principal: Kathy Hannah
- Faculty: 100
- Grades: 9–12
- Gender: Girls
- Enrollment: 400 (2021)
- Campus size: 28-acre (110,000 m^{2})
- Campus type: Suburban
- Colors: Lavender and white
- Athletics conference: Washington Catholic Athletic Conference
- Mascot: Tartan
- Nickname: AHC
- Team name: Tartans
- Rival: Our Lady of Good Counsel
- Accreditation: Middle States Association of Colleges and Schools
- National ranking: 1
- Publication: Images (Literary Magazine)
- Yearbook: Cross and Anchor
- Tuition: $32,575
- Admissions Director: Barbara Murray
- Website: www.academyoftheholycross.org

The Academy of the Holy Cross is a Catholic college preparatory school sponsored by the Sisters of the Holy Cross and founded in 1868. The academy is located on a 28-acre (110,000 m^{2}) campus in North Bethesda, Maryland (Kensington postal address), north of Washington, D.C.

== Notable alumnae ==
- Rhamat Alhassan, volleyball player for Florida and winner of the Honda Sports Award for volleyball
- Joan Cushing, political satirist and playwright
- Helen Hayes, award-winning (EGOT) actress
- Monica McNutt, basketball analyst for ESPN
- Hilary Rhoda, model
- Paige Minturn, well known acapella singer (2013)

== Alma Mater ==
Holy Cross we sing to thee,

Pledging our fidelity;

Cross and anchor, emblems bright,

Guiding us to heaven's light.

From our Alma Mater through the years

We’ll find strength from strife and fears.

Hail to thee, Spes Unica

Hail from thy daughters, Holy Cross.
