= The Wonderful O =

Book by James Thurber

- First edition
- Author: James Thurber
- Illustrator: Marc Simont
- Language: English
- Genre: Fantasy
- Publisher: Simon & Schuster
- Publication date: 1957
- Publication place: United States
- Media type: Print (Hardcover)
- Pages: 72

The Wonderful O is the last of James Thurber’s five short-book fairy tales for children. Published in 1957 by Hamish Hamilton/Simon Schuster, it followed Many Moons (1943), The Great Quillow (1944), The White Deer (1945) and The 13 Clocks (1950).

As well as constant, complex wordplay, Thurber uses other literary devices such as frequent internal meter or rhythmic prose, near-poetry, puns, literary allusions (e.g. to wandering minstrels) and thus creates a humorous satire involving loss, love and freedom. The Wonderful O uses a form of constrained writing or lipogram where the letter O is omitted at the demands of the villains.

It was one of several of Thurber's works illustrated by his friend and frequent illustrator Marc Simont after Thurber went blind during the 1950s.

The original brief back-cover blurb was written by E. B. White.

The London Review of Books called it a "linguistic romp with an important lesson at its heart" and "a tale of loss, liberty and language laced with typical Thurberian wit". School Librarian wrote that "The period coloured illustrations add to the charm to make a very inviting book".

The 2009 reprint by The New York Review Children's Collection has the original illustrations by Marc Simont. For the Puffin Books edition (1962), The Wonderful O was joined with The 13 Clocks, and both stories were illustrated by Ronald Searle.

Melissa Manchester was nominated for the Grammy Award for Best Spoken Word Album for Children.

== Sources ==
- Penguin (Puffin Books) edition (1962) ISBN 0140301801
- New York Review Children's Collection (2009) ISBN 1-59017-309-0
- Attebery, Brian (1980). The Fantasy Tradition in American Literature. ISBN 0-253-35665-2
