= Skinnybones =

Children's novel by Barbara Park

- First edition (publ. Knopf)
- Author: Barbara Park
- Language: English
- Publisher: Knopf
- Publication date: 1982
- ISBN: 0-394-84988-4 (first edition)
- LC Class: PZ7.P2197 Sk

Skinnybones is a 1982 children's novel written by Barbara Park. It is Park's most popular book, and has won numerous awards for children's literature. It was followed up by a sequel in 1988 called Almost Starring Skinnybones.

The story is narrated by the main character, Alex Frankovitch, a rather unpopular and awkward grade school boy.

== Plot summary ==
After writing a letter in a promotional contest for a cat food company, Alex goes on to describe key points in his young life, mainly having to do with little league baseball, occasionally going off on tangents or telling other stories from his life that, while not important to the story, are points of humor and show Alex's thoughts and feelings more clearly.

Though Alex has played in Little League for six years, his skills in the game are subpar (he refers to himself as "really stinky" when it comes to baseball). He is constantly berated by his nemesis, T.J. Stoner, a player widely known for his incredible skill. After numerous attempts to get T.J. to leave him alone fail, Alex tries besting T.J. in a pitching contest, at which he fails miserably. A few days later, Alex's team and T.J's team are playing a game against each other, and T.J. once again tries to make Alex look foolish. During the game, Alex bunts the ball and runs to first, where T.J. is set to get Alex out. Desperate to stop him, Alex jumps up and down, screaming "BOOGA BOOGA!" This makes T.J. miss the ball, allowing Alex to get a double. Alex is called out by the umpire immediately after for interfering with the play at first base. Though Alex was thrown out, he accomplished something better than getting a double to him: making T.J. embarrassed. When T.J. looks like he's going to beat Alex up, Alex runs home and locks himself in his room.

Though Alex tries to become a hermit, an effort which lasts only a few hours, he's forced to go back to school the next day, where the students and teachers all make fun at his expense. T.J. gets a spot in the Guinness Book of World Records for beating Alex's team, and Alex, in a twist of good luck, ends up winning the contest from the cat food company that he wrote a letter to at the book's opening. By winning, Alex will get to appear on a national television commercial. He leaves school that day, nervous about filming the commercial, but eager to be a big star and hoping things will go well.
