= Craig Sharmat =

American musician (born 1957)

- Birth name: Craig Lynden Sharmat
- Born: October 8, 1957 (age 67); New York City, New York
- Genres: TV and film score, jazz
- Occupation(s): Composer, guitarist
- Instrument(s): Guitar, bass, keyboards
- Years active: 1982–present
- Labels: Innervision Records
- Website: scoredog.tv

Craig Lynden Sharmat (born October 8, 1957) is an American musician. He composes music for television and film and is an accomplished guitarist whose work has been noticed in the smooth jazz charts. He has scored a wide variety of reality shows, animation, television commercials, and documentary movies. He has also played guitar on thousands of cues and backed up a number of commercial artists as guitarist and or arranger. He released his first jazz single in 2009, "So Cal Drivin"; the album of the same name was released later that year. His second album, Outside In, contains the song "Ease Up", which reached number two on the Billboard Smooth Jazz chart.

== Biography ==
Born in New York City, Sharmat attended Syracuse University as a music major. He transferred to The University of Arizona, finishing his studies at G.I.T. (now called Musicians Institute). Sharmat's early professional years were filled playing gigs and occasional sessions, moving to Las Vegas to play showroom gigs by 1983. Craig returned to Los Angeles in 1985, where he quickly landed the role of guitarist for saxman Ronnie Laws. A tour with singer Randy Crawford soon followed, though Sharmat later moved away from touring to score his first TV series, Disney's Kids Incorporated, arranging and composing the final 3 years of the series. During the same time frame, Sharmat scored the background music to the American TV series Xuxa. Since 1995, Sharmat has written music for America's Most Wanted. This show led to his finding work with Sirens Media, for which he has written the main titles and background music for The Real Housewives of New Jersey among many other shows. He also wrote the opening for the 2007 MTV Movie Awards featuring Sarah Silverman. In 2008, Sharmat scored the movie Gotta Dance, and in 2011 scored the film Carol Channing Larger Than Life, which was produced and directed by Tony award winner Dori Berinstein. Sharmat is a graduate of Spud Murphy's "Equal Interval System" (EIS) music composition course. Sharmat also runs Scoredog Music, a music library company that has furnished music to a multitude of TV shows.

Craig has written a significant amount of music for Warner/Chappell Music, a major music library based in Nashville, Tennessee.

Sharmat is the son of Marjorie Weinman Sharmat, a prolific children's writer who is best known for Nate the Great, the boy detective featured in a long-running series of picture books (1972 to present). His father Mitchell Sharmat created Nate's cousin, the girl detective Olivia Sharp, who debuted in 1989. During the 1990s Craig Sharmat and his mother wrote three 40-page Nate the Great books together. All three were illustrated by Nate's co-creator Marc Simont (1915–2013).

- Nate the Great and the Musical Note (Coward-McCann, 1990)
- Nate the Great and the Tardy Tortoise (Delacorte Press, 1995)
- Nate the Great and the Crunchy Christmas (Delacorte, 1996)

== Discography ==
- So Cal Drivin' (2009)
- Outside In (2010)
- Bleu Horizons (2013)
- Nouveau (2019)
