= Marc Simont =

Paris-born American artist, political cartoonist, and illustrator (1915-2013)

- Born: November 23, 1915; Paris, France
- Died: July 13, 2013 (aged 97); West Cornwall, Connecticut, U.S.
- Occupations: Artist, cartoonist, illustrator
- Writing career
- Period: 1939–2013
- Genre: Children's literature including picture books
- Notable work: Nate the Great series
- Notable awards: Caldecott Medal; 1957

Marc Simont (November 23, 1915 – July 13, 2013) was a Paris-born American artist, political cartoonist, and illustrator of more than a hundred children's books. Inspired by his father, Spanish painter Joseph Simont, he began drawing at an early age. Simont settled in New York City in 1935 after encouragement from his father, attended the National Academy of Design with Robert McCloskey, and served three years in the military.

Simont's first illustrated children's book was published in 1939. In 1952, Jareb, a book he illustrated alongside author Miriam Powell, won the Child Study Association of America's Children's Book Award (now Bank Street Children's Book Committee's Josette Frank Award). He won the 1957 Caldecott Medal for U.S. children's book illustration, recognizing A Tree Is Nice by Janice May Udry, and he was a runner-up both in 1950 (The Happy Day by Ruth Krauss) and in 2002 (The Stray Dog retold by Simont).

He also illustrated The 13 Clocks (1950) and The Wonderful O (1957) by the writer James Thurber; In the Year of the Boar and Jackie Robinson by Bette Bao Lord (1984); Top Secret by John Reynolds Gardiner (1995); My Brother, Ant by Betsy Byars (1996); and The Beautiful Planet: Ours to Lose, which he also wrote (2010), and illustrated The Trail Driving Rooster by Fred Gipson (1955).

Simont and writer Marjorie W. Sharmat created the boy detective Nate the Great in 1972, and he illustrated the first twenty cases, through 1998.

As cartoonist for The Lakeville Journal in Connecticut, he won the 2007 James Aronson Award for Social Justice Journalism from Hunter College.

Simont married Sara "Bee" Dalton in 1945; they remained married until his death. He died at his home in West Cornwall, Connecticut, on July 13, 2013 at the age of 97.

== Notable works ==
- The Pirate of Chatham Square: A Story of Old New York (1939)
- The First Story (1947)
- The Happy Day (1949, Caldecott Honor Book)
- The 13 Clocks (1950)
- The Backward Day (1950)
- How to Get to First Base: A Picture Book of Baseball (1952)
- Jareb (1952, written by Miriam Powell, Child Study Association of America's Children's Book Award)
- Lovely Summer (1952)
- Mimi (1954)
- The Trail Driving Rooster (1955)
- A Tree Is Nice (1956, Caldecott Medal winner in 1957)
- The Wonderful O (1957)
- The Contest at Paca (1959)
- How Come Elephants? (1965)
- Every Time I Climb a Tree (1967)
- Nate the Great (1972)
- Nate the Great Goes Undercover (1974)
- Nate the Great and the Lost List (1975)
- The Beetle Bush (1976)
- The Contests at Cowlick (1976)
- Nate the Great and the Phony Clue (1977)
- Nate the Great and the Sticky Case (1978)
- How to Dig a Hole to the Other Side of the World (1979)
- Nate the Great and the Missing Key (1981)
- No More Monsters for Me! (1981)
- Nate the Great and the Snowy Trail (1982)
- The Philharmonic Gets Dressed (1982)
- In the Year of the Boar and Jackie Robinson (1984)
- Nate the Great and the Fishy Prize (1985)
- The Dallas Titans Get Ready for Bed (1986)
- Nate the Great Stalks Stupidweed (1986)
- Sing a Song of Popcorn: Every Child's Book of Poems (1988) (Compiled by Beatrice Schenk de Regniers)
- Nate the Great Goes Down in the Dumps (1989)
- Many Moons (1990)
- Nate the Great and the Musical Note (1990)
- The Big Book for Peace (1990) (Compiled by Ann Durell and Marilyn Sachs, Written by Marilyn Sachs)
- Nate the Great and the Stolen Base (1992)
- Nate the Great and the Pillowcase (1993)
- Top Secret (1995)
- My Brother, Ant (1996)
- Ant Plays Bear (1997)
- The Goose That Almost Got Cooked (1997)
- Nate the Great Saves the King of Sweden (1997)
- Nate the Great and Me: The Case of the Fleeing Fang (1998)
- The Stray Dog (2000, author/illustrator; Caldecott Honor Book)
- Secret Lives of Walter Mitty and of James Thurber (2006)
- The Beautiful Planet: Ours to Lose (2010)
