= Sorority Sisters (novel series) =

Novel series by Marjorie W. Sharmat

- Author: Marjorie W. Sharmat
- Country: United States
- Language: English
- Discipline: novels
- Publisher: Laurel Leaf Press
- Published: 1986–1987
- No. of books: 8

Sorority Sisters is an eight-title novel series written by Marjorie W. Sharmat between 1986 and 1987 and published by Laurel Leaf Press. This series focused on two different sororities in a fictional high school in Arizona. Palm Canyon may be located somewhere around Tucson because some characters imported dates from that area. This series was written with a humorous tone.

== Plot summary ==
At Palm Canyon High School, located in fictional Palm Canyon, Arizona, most girls aspired to be members of Chi Kappa, the most prestigious sorority at the school. One of their many rules was that they kept membership strictly at ten members.

A girl named Elissa Hanes wanted to join, as did her friend Kim Adler. Kim and a newcomer were accepted, but Elissa wasn't. However, Kim got disgusted with the sorority's scheming tactics and quit the group in public.

Elissa and Kim eventually created their own sorority, The Pack. They set a limit of ten members and invited any girl who was interested to join. The 10-member limit often used by Chi Kappa would help legitimize the Pack as a solid group.

Tracy McVane, another former Chi Kappa member and friend of Elissa's, joined the Pack after being offended by Chi Kappa's unethical behavior. Some of the other Chi Kappa members, such as Melanie Deborah Kane and Daisy Baron, were also allies of the Pack despite their membership in the more established Chi Kappa. The officers were de facto until the next year.

Many of the stories, covering two of the eight books in the series, focused on the students' lives and the rivalry between the two sororities: the established Chi Kappa and the up-and-coming Pack. The characters narrated the stories. Most narrators came from the Pack with five narrators, while Chi Kappa had three.

== Titles ==
There are eight books in the Sorority Sisters series.

#	Title	First Published	ISBN	Narrator
1	For Members Only	May 1986	9780440926542	Kim Adler
2	Snobs, Beware	June 1986	9780440980926	Elissa Haines
3	I Think I'm Falling in Love	July 1986	9780440940111	Tracy McVane
4	Fighting Over Me	August 1986	9780440925309	Fritzi Tass
5	Nobody knows How Scared I Am	May 1987	9780440962670	Daisy Baron
6	Here Comes Mr. Right	June 1987	9780440938415	Melanie Deborah Kane
7	Getting Closer	July 1987	9780440928287	Bridget Jawinski
8	I'm Going to Get Your Boyfriend	July 1987	9780440940043	Rona Dunne

== Reception ==
Publishers Weekly reviewed the first book in the series: "Although not as funny as Sheila Greenwald's Rosy Cole books, which are aimed at the same audience, this attractively designed, easy-to-read title will undoubtedly garner its own fans".
