= In the Year of the Boar and Jackie Robinson =

1984 children's novel by Bette Bao Lord and illustrator Marc Simont

- First edition
- Author: Bette Bao Lord
- Illustrator: Marc Simont
- Genre: Realistic Fiction
- Publisher: Harper & Row
- Publication date: 1984
- Pages: 170
- ISBN: 978-0064401753

In the Year of the Boar and Jackie Robinson is a 1984 children's novel by Bette Bao Lord and illustrator Marc Simont about a young girl named Shirley Temple Wong who leaves a secure life within her clan in China following World War II.

== Plot ==
In 1947, the Year of the Boar, Sixth Cousin, also known as Bandit, leaves China with her parents for a new beginning in America. Proud of the American name that she chose herself, Shirley Temple Wong is optimistic that her new home will be the land of many opportunities. However, it is harder than she expected. Though her classmates in Brooklyn come from a variety of backgrounds, Shirley is the only one who does not speak English, and she worries that she will never have a friend. Then Shirley gets in a fight with Mabel, the tallest, scariest, and fastest girl in the fifth grade. Though Shirley winds up with two black eyes, she is faithful to the code of childhood and does not tell anyone what happened. Her silence gains her the respect and friendship of Mabel, who gives her the gift that truly changes her life: baseball. Soon, Shirley is the biggest Brooklyn Dodgers fan of all, listening to the radio to hear the triumphs and heartbreaks of the team and her hero, Jackie Robinson. Meanwhile, she takes piano lessons from her landlord, Señora Rodriguez, and saves money by baby-sitting Mrs. O'Reilly's triplets. Shirley begins to feel at home, and yet deep within herself Shirley discovers that she wants to hold on to her memories of China, and the knowledge that she is Chinese inside, as well as American. Shirley can be both — a "double happiness." However, when Shirley is sad, there is always someone painting.

== Background ==
Author Bette Bao Lord immigrated to the United States from China at age eight after her father was sent to the United States and was unable to return to China due to political unrest. In the Year of the Boar and Jackie Robinson captures some of Lord's experiences as an immigrant.

== Reception ==
According to Kirkus Reviews, early scenes in the book have a "slightly artificial, storybook quality", though they found that the novel "becomes an endearing, warming account of immigrant woes and joys".

Beyond critical reception, the novel has been utilized in classroom teaching, where students are encouraged to discuss the book's approach to conflict resolution, deviation from the norm, and multiculturalism, as well as learn about Chinese culture and traditions.

== Adaptation ==
In the Year of the Boar and Jackie Robinson has been adapted into a stage play by Mark Branner.
