= The 13 Clocks =

Fantasy tale by James Thurber

- Author: James Thurber
- Illustrator: Marc Simont
- Cover artist: Marc Simont
- Language: English
- Genre: Fantasy
- Publisher: Simon & Schuster
- Publication date: January 1, 1950
- Publication place: United States
- Media type: Print (hardcover)
- Pages: 124 pp
- ISBN: 0-671-72100-3
- OCLC: 25330722

The 13 Clocks is a fantasy tale written by James Thurber in 1950, while he was in Bermuda completing one of his other novels. It is written in a unique cadenced style, in which a mysterious prince must complete a seemingly impossible task to free a maiden from the clutches of an evil duke. It invokes many fairy tale motifs.

The story is noted for Thurber's constant, complex wordplay, and his use of an almost continuous internal meter, with occasional hidden rhymes — akin to blank verse, but with no line breaks to advertise the structure. Other fantasy books by Thurber, such as Many Moons, The Wonderful O (published 1958), and particularly The White Deer, also contained hints of this unusual prose form, but here it becomes a universal feature of the text, to the point where it is possible to predict the word order for a given phrase (for example, "the Golux said" vs. "said the Golux") by looking at the pattern of emphasis in the preceding phrase.

By the time he wrote this book, Thurber was blind, so he could not draw cartoons for the book, as he had done with The White Deer five years earlier. He enlisted his friend Marc Simont to illustrate the original edition. The Golux is said to wear an "indescribable hat". Thurber made Simont describe all his illustrations, and was satisfied when Simont was unable to describe the hat. When it was reissued by Puffin Books, it was illustrated by Ronald Searle. The book has been reprinted by The New York Review Children's Collection, with Simont's original illustrations and an introduction by Neil Gaiman.

== Plot summary ==
The evil Duke of Coffin Castle lives with his good and beautiful niece, the princess Saralinda, in a castle so cold that all the clocks have frozen at ten minutes to five. Several suitors have tried to court the Princess, but the Duke's policy is to test their eligibility by assigning them impossible tasks and slaying them when they inevitably fail (or for any imagined offense). A few days before Saralinda's twenty-first birthday, Prince Zorn of Zorna arrives in the town disguised as a minstrel named Xingu and learns of Saralinda. He falls in with an enigmatic guide known as the Golux, who "must always be on hand when people are in peril" and has "saved a score of princes in [his] time." Soon after, he is arrested for singing mocking songs about the Duke in public. Following advice from the Golux, Zorn convinces the Duke not to kill him immediately, and the Duke decides to allow him to court Saralinda. In the castle dungeon, the Golux reappears and gives Zorn more advice before mysteriously vanishing again just as a guard comes for Zorn.

Having learned "Xingu"'s true identity, the Duke assigns Zorn the task of finding a thousand jewels, and sets a deadline of 99 hours hence, which is too little time for Zorn to obtain the jewels from his father's kingdom of Zorna. In addition, the Duke demands that upon his return to the castle Zorn must also find a way to restart all thirteen frozen clocks. Zorn accepts the terms and leaves the castle; outside, he is joined by the Golux, who has a plan to acquire the jewels.

With the magical guiding help of a rose given to them by Saralinda, Zorn and the Golux travel to the home of Hagga, a woman who, thanks to an act of kindness to a king in trouble, had been given the magical ability to weep jewels rather than tears. When they finally arrive, she tells them that because she has wept out of sorrow so much in order to provide jewels for others she can no longer weep from sadness; now she can only weep from laughter, adding that such jewels will turn back into tears a fortnight (fourteen days) later. Undeterred by this, the Golux and Zorn try to make her laugh, but when she does weep from laughter she only weeps less-than-valuable gemstones. Then, for no apparent reason, Hagga begins laughing so hard she weeps precious jewels. The Golux and Zorn obtain a thousand of these short-lived jewels of laughter from her, and with forty hours left they depart, accidentally leaving behind the guiding rose.

Back at the castle, the Duke reveals to his spy Hark that Saralinda is not in fact his niece, but a child he stole from a faraway kingdom years ago and that once she turns 21 he plans to wed her; he was prevented from doing so previously because of a spell cast on him by Saralinda's nurse when he kidnapped the child. An important part of the spell's terms was that "[Saralinda] can be saved and [the Duke] destroyed only by a prince whose name begins with 'X' and doesn't," and since Zorn had used the alias "Xingu" he is the prince destined to save Saralinda. With less than an hour left, the Prince and Golux return to the castle with the jewels, gaining entrance by climbing to an upper chamber. While the Duke and his guards are chasing Zorn throughout the castle's upper floors, the Golux, with the help of Saralinda, finds a way to restart the clocks as required. Zorn traps the Duke's guards in a tower room, and he, the Golux, Saralinda and Hark confront the Duke. Presented with the thousand jewels (the count of which is verified) and the sound of all thirteen clocks striking, the Duke is forced to admit defeat. Zorn and the Princess happily depart by ship, first to the kingdom of Yarrow (where Saralinda's father, who had granted Hagga her gift of weeping jewels, lives) and then on to the Prince's homeland of Zorna.

A fortnight later, while the Duke is gloating over his jewels, they transform back into tears. The enraged Duke, deprived of both his intended bride and his jewels, is then "gleeped" by the Todal, a creature sent by the Devil to punish evil-doers for failing to do sufficient evil. When Hark enters the chamber, he finds it empty, except for the Duke's sword on the floor and the liquified jewels of Hagga's laughter dripping from the table.

== Reception ==
Boucher and McComas praised the book as "magically adorned with touches of modern humor, hints of dark Jacobean terror, and gleams of pure poetry.".

The USA's Common Core State Standards Initiative includes The 13 Clocks as a text exemplar for second and third grades.

== Audio ==
Audio recordings have been narrated by Lauren Bacall (Pathways of Sound, POS 1039 & 1040), Peter Ustinov (Caedmon Audio, 1980, ISBN 978-0-898-45429-1) and Edward Woodward (Dove Entertainment, 1994, ISBN 978-1-558-00631-7 and Phoenix Audio, 2022, ISBN 978-1-597-77688-2).

In 1969, WBAI 99.5-FM in New York City broadcast an audio production which currently exists in the Pacifica Radio Archives; very little information currently exists as to the cast list.

On 22 December 1973, BBC Radio 4 broadcast a version of the story, adapted by Peter Fieldson, on Afternoon Theatre, with Heron Carvic as the Golux, Nigel Lambert as Prince Zorn, John Rowe as the Narrator, Paul Hardwick as the Duke, Godfrey Kenton as Hark, Pauline Wynn as Hagga, Sandra Clark as Saralinda and David Sinclair as the Captain.

== Stage and film ==
The story was set to music by Mark Bucci and appeared in 1953 as the fifth episode of The Motorola Television Hour, with Basil Rathbone as the evil Duke.

A musical-theater adaptation, titled "Hooray for Now", was written by New York duo Peter Haas (book and lyrics) and Gene Goldberg (music), in the 1950s, and was presented to Mr Thurber's widow, Helen Wismer, who did not approve it. A song from the show "I Wish You Well" has been covered by Skitch Henderson and several New York cabaret artists.

The story was adapted and produced by Stephen Teeter for use in the 1960s in a production in Berkeley, California. Later it was adapted and produced for the stage by Frank Lowe and published in 1976 by Samuel French, Inc. (ISBN 978-0-573-65122-9).

In 1968, Warner Bros. hired producer Mervyn LeRoy to make a film of The 13 Clocks, and the Sherman Brothers wrote a score. The project was cancelled, but the score was released on the Unsung Sherman Brothers CD.

A three part Jackanory adaptation was broadcast on BBC One 28–30 December 1983 starring Colin Jeavons as the Duke, Roy Kinnear as the Golux, Yolande Palfrey as Saralinda and Simon Shepherd as Prince Zorn.

Christopher Theofanidis wrote an opera based on the story in 2002.

Visual artist Juan Delcán created a short animated film of the opening chapter of the book, with narration by Neil Gaiman.
