= Marjorie W. Sharmat =

American children's writer (1928–2019)

- Born: Marjorie Weinman; November 12, 1928; Portland, Maine, United States
- Died: March 12, 2019 (aged 90); Munster, Indiana, United States
- Education: Westbrook Junior College
- Occupation: Writer
- Partner: Mitchell Sharmat
- Relatives: Craig Sharmat, Andrew Sharmat (sons)
- Writing career
- Pen name: Wendy Andrews
- Genre: Children's literature
- Notable awards: Book of the Year Citation from the Library of Congress 1967

Marjorie Weinman Sharmat (November 12, 1928 – March 12, 2019) was an American children's writer. She wrote more than 130 books for children and teens and her books have been translated into several languages. They have won awards including Book of the Year by the Library of Congress or have become selections by the Literary Guild.

Perhaps Sharmat's most popular work features the child detective Nate the Great. He was inspired by and named after her father, who lived to see the first Nate book published. One story, Nate the Great Goes Undercover, was adapted as a made-for-TV movie that won the Los Angeles International Children's Film Festival Award. Sharmat's husband Mitchell Sharmat expanded Nate's storyline by creating Olivia Sharp, his cousin and fellow detective. Husband and wife wrote four Olivia Sharp books published 1989 to 1991. During the 1990s, their son Craig Sharmat (then in his thirties) wrote three Nate books with his mother. In the late 2010s, their other son Andrew co-wrote the last two Nate books written while Marjorie Weinman Sharmat was alive. With Marjorie Weinman Sharmat's passing in 2019 Andrew has continued writing the series with Nate the Great and the Earth Day Robot (2021).

In the mid-1980s Sharmat wrote three books published in 1984 and 1985 under the pseudonym Wendy Andrews (below).

Sharmat also wrote the Sorority Sisters series, eight short novels published in 1986 and 1987 (not listed below). They are romantic fiction with a sense of humor. They are set in a California public high school (day school for ages 14 to 18, approximately).

== Life ==
Sharmat, who was born in Portland, Maine, on November 12, 1928, graduated from Westbrook Junior College in 1948. Sharmat's parents were Nathan and Anna Richardson Weinman. Nathan Weinman was a dry goods manufacturer and dealer. She had one sister, Rosalind.

Sharmat died on March 12, 2019, at the age of 90.

== Works ==
Many of Sharmat's publications belong to one of the series (below) Nate the Great (from 1972), Morris Brookside (1973–1974), Olivia Sharp (1989–1991), or Duz Shedd (1993–2000).

- Rex (Harper & Row, 1967), picture book illustrated by Emily McCully (this list otherwise mixes picture books and longer works without comment)
- Goodnight, Andrew; Goodnight Craig (Harper, 1969), illus. Mary Chalmers – named after sons Andrew Sharmat and Craig Sharmat
- Gladys Told Me to Meet Her Here (Harper, 1970), illus. Edward Frascino
- A Visit with Rosalind (Macmillan, 1971), illus. Lisl Weil – named after sister Rosalind Weinman
- 51 Sycamore Lane (Macmillan, 1971), illus. Lisl Weil
- A Hot Thirsty Day (Macmillan, 1971), illus. Rosemary Wells
- Getting Something on Maggie Marmelstein (Harper, 1971), illus. Ben Shecter
- Sophie and Gussie, 1973 (illus. Lillian Hoban)
- I Want Mama, 1974 (illus. Emily Arnold McCully); German edition, Mama liegt im Krankenhaus (Carlsen, 1976)
- Walter the Wolf, 1975 (illus. Kelly Oechsli)
- Mooch the Messy, 1976 (illus. Ben Shecter)
- I'm Terrific, 1977 (illus. Kay Chorao)
- Mitchell Is Moving, 1978 (illus. Jose Aruego and Ariane Dewey)
- A Big Fat Enormous Lie, 1978 (illus. David McPhail)
- Thornton, the Worrier, 1978 (illus. Kay Chorao)
- Mooch the Messy Meets Prudence the Neat, 1978 (illus. Ben Schecter)
- Mr. Jameson & Mr. Phillips, 1979 (illus. Bruce Degen)
- Uncle Boris and Maude, 1979 (illus. Sammis McLean)
- I Am Not a Pest, 1979 (co-wrote with Mitchell Sharmat; illus. Diane Dawson)
- Griselda's New Year, 1979 (illus. Normand Chartier)
- Octavia Told Me a Secret, 1979 (illus. Rosanne Litzinger)
- Say Hello, Vanessa, 1979 (illus. Lillian Hoban)
- Scarlet Monster Lives Here, 1979 (illus. Dennis Kendrick)
- The Trolls of Twelfth Street, 1979 (illus. Ben Shecter)
- Sasha the Silly, 1979 (illus. Janet Stevens)
- The 329th Friend, 1979 (illus. Cindy Szekeres)
- The Day I was Born, 1980 (co-wrote with Mitchell Sharmat; illus. Diane Dawson)
- Gila Monsters Meet you at the Airport, 1980 (illus. by Byron Barton)
- Grumley the Grouch, 1980 (illus. Kay Chorao)
- Sometimes Mama and Papa Fight, 1980 (illus. Kay Chorao)
- What Are we Going to do About Andrew?, 1980 (illus. Ray Cruz)
- Lucretia the Unbearable, 1981 (illus. Janet Stevens)
- Twitchell the Wishful, 1981 (illus. Janet Stevens)
- Chasing After Annie, 1981 (illus. Marc Simont)
- Little Devil Gets Sick, 1982 (illus. Marylin Hafner)
- Two Ghosts on a Bench, 1982 (illus. Nola Langner)
- How to Meet a Gorgeous Guy, 1983
- I Saw Him First (Delacorte Press, 1983) – romantic fiction for teens
- The Seven Sloppy Days of Phineas Pig, 1983 (illus. Sue Truesdell)
- Rich Mitch, 1983 (illus. Loretta Lustig)
- How to Meet a Gorgeous Girl, 1984
- He Noticed I'm Alive – and Other Hopeful Signs, 1984
- My Mother Never Listens to Me 1984 (illus. Lynn Munsinger)
- Supergirl Storybook: Based on the Motion Picture Supergirl, G. P. Putnam, 1984 (as Wendy Andrews)
- Vacation Fever!, Pacer Books, 1984 (as Wendy Andrews)
- Are We There Yet?, Pacer Books, 1985 (as Wendy Andrews)
- One Terrific Thanksgiving, 1985
- Two Guys Noticed Me – and Other Miracles, 1985
- Get Rich Mitch, 1985 (illus. Loretta Lustig)
- Rollo and Juliet Forever, 1986 (illus. Marylin Hafner)
- Hooray for Mother's Day!, 1986
- Hooray for Father's Day!, 1987
- I'm the Best, 1991 (illus. Will Hillenbrand)

=== Morris Brookside ===
Illustrated by Ronald Himler:

- Morris Brookside, a Dog, 1973
- Morris Brookside is Missing 1974

=== Duz Shedd, or Genghis Kahn ===
Illustrated by Mitchell Rigie:

1. Hollywood Hound: A Duz Shedd Story (AKA The Great Genghis Khan Look-Alike Contest), 1993
2. A Dog Star is Born: A Duz Shedd Story (AKA Genghis Kahn: A Dog Star is Born) 1994
3. Dog-Gone Hollywood: A Duz Shedd Story (AKA Genghis Kahn: Dog-Gone Hollywood) 1994
4. Dirty Tricks: A Duz Shedd Story, 2000

=== Nate the Great ===
Illustrated by Marc Simont; later by Martha Weston (as chapter books) and Jody Wheeler (also as chapter books):

1. Nate the Great, 1972
2. Nate the Great Goes Undercover, 1974
3. Nate the Great and the Lost List, 1975
4. Nate the Great and the Phony Clue, 1977
5. Nate the Great and the Sticky Case, 1978
6. Nate the Great and the Missing Key, 1981
7. Nate the Great and the Snowy Trail, 1983
8. Nate the Great and the Fishy Prize, 1985
9. Nate the Great Stalks Stupidweed, 1986
10. Nate the Great and the Boring Beach Bag, 1987
11. Nate the Great Goes Down in the Dumps, 1989
12. Nate the Great and the Halloween Hunt, 1989
13. Nate the Great and the Musical Note, 1990 (written with son Craig Sharmat)
14. Nate the Great and the Stolen Base, 1992
15. Nate the Great and the Pillowcase, 1993 (written with sister Rosalind Weinman)
16. Nate the Great and the Mushy Valentine, 1994
17. Nate the Great and the Tardy Tortoise, 1995 (with Craig Sharmat)
18. Nate the Great and the Crunchy Christmas, 1996 (with Craig Sharmat)
19. Nate the Great Saves the King of Sweden, 1997
20. Nate the Great and Me: The Case of the Fleeing Fang, 1998
21. Nate the Great and the Monster Mess, 1999 (illus. by Martha Weston)
22. Nate the Great, San Francisco Detective, 2000 (written with husband Mitchell Sharmat; illus. by Weston)
23. Nate the Great and the Big Sniff, 2001 (with Mitchell Sharmat; illus. by Weston)
24. Nate the Great on the Owl Express, 2003 (with Mitchell Sharmat; illus. by Weston)
25. Nate the Great Talks Turkey, 2006 (with Mitchell Sharmat; illus. by Jody Wheeler)
26. Nate the Great and the Hungry Book Club, 2009 (with Mitchell Sharmat; illus. by Wheeler)
27. Nate the Great, Where Are You?, 2015 (with Mitchell Sharmat; illus. by Wheeler)
28. Nate the Great and the Missing Birthday Snake, 2018 (with son Andrew Sharmat; illus. by Wheeler)
29. Nate the Great and the Wandering Word, 2019 (with son Andrew Sharmat; illus. by Wheeler)

=== Olivia Sharp ===
Featuring Nate the Great's cousin, Olivia Sharp, "Agent for Secrets". Co-written with husband Mitchell Sharmat, and illustrated by Denise Brunkus:

1. The Pizza Monster, 1989
2. Princess of the Filmore Street School, 1989
3. The Sly Spy, 1990
4. The Green Toenails Gang, 1991
5. Akulakhan, 2002
