= Bette Bao Lord =

Chinese-American writer

- Chinese: 包柏漪
- Born: November 3, 1938 (age 87); Shanghai, Republic of China
- Education: Tufts University
- Occupations: Novelist, short story writer, civic activist
- Spouse: Winston Lord
- Children: 2
- Mother: Dora Bao
- Relatives: Cathy Bao Bean (sister)

Bette Bao Lord (Chinese: 包柏漪, Pinyin: Bāo Bóyì; born November 3, 1938) is a Chinese-born American writer and civic activist for human rights and democracy.

== Early life ==
Lord was born as Bette Bao in Shanghai, China. With her mother and father, Dora and Sandys Bao, and her younger sister, Cathy Bao, she came to the United States at the age of eight when her father, a British-trained engineer, was sent there in 1946 by the Chinese government to purchase equipment. In 1949 Bette Bao Lord and her family were stranded in the United States when Mao Zedong and his communist rebels won the civil war in China.

Bette Bao Lord has written eloquently about her childhood experiences as a Chinese immigrant in the post-World War II United States in her autobiographical children's book In the Year of the Boar and Jackie Robinson. In this book she describes her efforts to learn English and to become accepted by her classmates and how she succeeds with the help of baseball and Jackie Robinson.

Lord went to public schools in Brooklyn and New Jersey. She earned a B.A. in Political Science at Tufts University in 1959 and a master's degree from the Fletcher School of Law and Diplomacy in 1960.

== Career ==
Lord worked as Assistant to the Director at the East-West Center in Hawaii, and as program officer at the Fulbright Program for professors in Washington, D.C.

In 1962, as refugees surged into Hong Kong, Bette's mother, Dora Bao, conceived and carried out a plan to get her third daughter, nicknamed Sansan (Putonghua, Sānsān, "Threethree") (Jean Bao) out of the People's Republic of China. Bette's book, Eighth Moon, written with Sansan's help, tells Sansan's story. Sansan was a bridesmaid at Bette's wedding to Winston Lord, a Foreign Service Officer.

Winston became a principal adviser to Henry Kissinger on relations with the PRC, and in 1973, he and Bette had a visit with her family in the PRC, a visit which inspired Bette to write Spring Moon.

Spring Moon (1981), which spans the times from pre-revolutionary China to Nixon's visit, was an international bestseller and American Book Award nominee for best first novel. The Middle Heart (1996) spans 70 years of modern Chinese history, ending in 1989 with the student-led demonstrations at Tiananmen Square. Her children's book, In the Year of the Boar and Jackie Robinson, has become a classic used in schools nationwide. Her true stories of Chinese people, Legacies: A Chinese Mosaic, was also a bestseller and chosen by Time as one of the five best non-fiction works of the year. Ms. Lord's works have received numerous awards and been translated into 15–20 languages.

In addition to chairing Freedom House, Ms. Lord has served on many other boards including the Newseum, The Freedom Forum, the international U.S. Agency for Global Media, the Council on Foreign Relations, and WNET.

Bette Bao Lord is a recipient of seven honorary degrees (including Notre Dame, Tufts, and Pepperdine) and many awards as author, democracy advocate and outstanding immigrant. These include the USIA Award for Outstanding Contributions. President Clinton in 1998 presented her the first Eleanor Roosevelt Award for Human Rights and hailed her as "someone who writes so powerfully about the past and is working so effectively to shape the future".

== Personal life ==
Lord is married to Winston Lord, former U.S. Ambassador to China. She has two children, Elizabeth Pillsbury Lord and Winston Bao Lord.

== Selected works ==
External videos
- Booknotes interview with Lord on Legacies: A Chinese Mosaic, May 27, 1990, C-SPAN

- Eighth Moon: The True Story of a Young Girl’s Life in Communist China, by [Bao] Sansan as told to Bette Lord [a story about the escape of Bette's youngest sister], New York: Harper & Row, 1964.
- Spring Moon: A Novel of China, New York: Harper & Row, 1981, ISBN 0060148934.
- In the Year of the Boar and Jackie Robinson, New York: Harper & Row, 1984.
- Legacies: A Chinese Mosaic, New York: Alfred A. Knopf, distributed by Random House, 1990.
- The Middle Heart, New York: Alfred A. Knopf, distributed by Random House, 1996.
- Exploring Realistic Fiction (Literature and Writing), by Bette Bao Lord, Jayne Pettit, Lael Littke, and Donna Perrone, New York: Scholastic, 1999.
