= The Graduation of Jake Moon =

2000 book by Barbara Park

- First edition
- Author: Barbara Park
- Original title: The Graduation of Jake Moon
- Illustrator: Paul Colin
- Language: English
- Published: 2000, Atheneum Books
- Pages: 128
- ISBN: 978-0-689-83912-2

The Graduation of Jake Moon is a children's book that was written by Barbara Park and published in 2000.

== Plot ==
The novel centers on Jake Moon's changing relationship with his grandfather, Skelly, whom he is very close with. But now, Skelly has Alzheimer's disease, and Jake feels more like he is the adult and Skelly is the kid. Caring for his grandfather has been very much left up to him, and this puts an increased burden on his own life.

== Praise ==
- Publishers Weekly gave a starred review to this "memorable" novel.
- School Library Journal recorded that "This novel demonstrates the horror of Alzheimer's disease, both to the afflicted person and to the loved ones, and it is written in an accessible style that will appeal to a wide audience."
