= The Happy Day (picture book) =

1949 Caldecott picture book

- First edition
- Author: Ruth Krauss
- Illustrator: Marc Simont
- Publisher: Harper & Brothers
- Publication date: 1949
- Pages: unpaged
- Awards: Caldecott Honor

The Happy Day is a 1949 picture book written by Ruth Krauss and illustrated by Marc Simont. In the book woodland creatures awake to find that it is spring. The book was a recipient of a 1949 Caldecott Honor for its illustrations.
