= Mick Harte Was Here =

1995 novella by Barbara Park

- First edition cover
- Author: Barbara Park
- Language: English
- Genre: Children's novel
- Publisher: Yearling (a division of Random House)
- Publication date: August 27, 1995
- Publication place: United States
- ISBN: 0-679-88203-0

Mick Harte Was Here is a novella written by Barbara Park, which focuses on how Phoebe, a thirteen-year-old girl, copes with the death of her brother, Mick Harte, who was killed in a bicycle accident due to head injuries he received while not wearing his helmet. In 1998, the book was awarded the annual William Allen White Children's Book Award.

== Plot summary ==
Thirteen-year-old Phoebe Harte's younger brother, Mick, dies in a bicycle accident, because he chooses not to wear a helmet. This brings an incredible amount of grief and sorrow to the Harte family. The book, narrated by Phoebe herself, shows the effect Mick's death has on his friends and schoolmates, and delves deeply into the grieving process experienced by Phoebe and her parents. The book delivers some of Phoebe's fondest memories of Mick—many of them relating the pranks that Mick enjoyed playing on his friends and family—in the form of anecdotes about when the two of them were younger.

According to Publishers Weekly, Park demonstrates a tremendous ability "to convey so affectingly both the individual and collective pain of this family's members." Park does this, not through melodrama, but rather through what Publishers Weekly calls a focus "on small moments", such as when Phoebe's father arrives home from the hospital and quietly closes the door to Mick's room.

== Reception ==
Park's novella was well-reviewed. Publishers Weekly called it "a full-fledged and fully convincing drama", lauding "Park's ability to make the events excruciatingly real while entirely avoiding the mawkish." In 1998, the book won the William Allen White Children's Book Award, an honor bestowed upon it by a vote of Kansas schoolchildren.

== Bicycle safety theme ==
In addition to the aforementioned focus of the novella on the grieving process, another theme woven into the fabric of the novella is that of bicycle safety. The book strongly suggests that had Mick been wearing a bicycle helmet, he would not have died from his injuries. In one scene, as Phoebe is experiencing a sense of guilt over Mick's death, her father sighs heavily, and says quietly, "If only I had made him wear his helmet." The theme is brought around again towards the end of the book, when Phoebe moves past her own pain and anger in what Publishers Weekly calls "a powerful scene in which Phoebe overcomes her own pain and anger to participate in a school assembly on bicycle safety." However, Publishers Weekly also notes that the theme of bicycle safety "never dominates the story", and that Park never allows the book to descend into a maudlin "cautionary tale."
