= Seymour Simon (author) =

American writer of children's books (born 1931)

Seymour Simon (born August 9, 1931) is an American writer of children's books; he is primarily a science writer.

== Biography ==
Simon was born in New York City. He graduated from the Bronx High School of Science and the City College of New York. A science teacher for 23 years, he began writing for children in the early 1960s.

Simon is often called one of the world's most prolific writers of science books for younger children (up to fifth grade, age 11 or so), with more than 250 titles listed in Books in Print and more than a dozen original e-books. He also writes fiction and created the series Einstein Anderson, Science Geek. He is a founder and director of the digital publishing company StarWalk Kids Media.

Simon's books encourage children to engage in activities to discover scientific principles, using household materials. For example, Let's Try It Out With Towers and Bridges asks, "What keeps trees from falling over? How do skyscrapers stand so tall? What makes a bridge strong? Let's try it out!" and shows children how to build a sturdy tower of blocks, create a solid foundation with clay, and make a paper bridge span short and long distances without falling

His books are frequent selections in the National Science Teachers Association's Outstanding Science Trade Books for Students.

Simon visits schools and talks to students and teachers, because it is contact with children, teachers, and librarians that has made him one of their favorite writers. "I haven't really given up teaching", says Simon, "and I suppose I never will, not as long as I keep writing."

== Personal life ==
He has three children and four grandchildren, and resides in Hudson Valley, New York. He is currently married to Liz Nealon, the CEO of StarWalk Kids Media and an award-winning producer and former creative director of the Sesame Street spinoff Children's Television Workshop.

== Awards and honors ==
Simon has received many awards and honors for his work.

- The New York State Knickerbocker Award for Juvenile Literature
- The Hope S. Dean Memorial Award from the Boston Public Library
- The Eva L. Gordon Award, presented by the American Nature Society, for his contribution to children's science literature
- The Washington Post/Children's Book Guild Award for Non-fiction for the body of his work
- Lifetime Achievement Award in Science Literature from Children from American Association for the Advancement of Science
- Kansas Reading Association 2001 Picture Book Award
- The 2002 Jeremiah Ludington Memorial Award, a Lifetime Achievement Award from the Educational Paperback Association (now the Educational Book and Media Association)
- 1992 National Forum on Children's Science Books Lifetime Achievement Commendation
- New York Time's One of the Years Best Illustrated Children's Books, Certificate of Excellence
- The New Jersey Reading Association 2003 Book Award for 'Out Of Sight'

June 29, 1999 was Seymour Simon day in Houston, Texas, in recognition of his "outstanding contributions and accomplishments".

August 2, 1999 was a day of recognition for Seymour Simon in Green Bay, Wisconsin, "who has engaged the mind of countless school children, with clear, thoughtful, thorough explanations, from crocodiles to the cosmos. We proclaim that Seymour Simon has done more than any other author to help us understand and appreciate the beauty of our planet and universe."

== Selected books ==
As of April 2014, this selection includes the three earliest (1968) and one latest (2014) of 259 Library of Congress Online Catalog search hits—for records of editions of books created by Simon.

- Animals in the Field and Laboratory: Science projects in animal behavior, illustrated by Emily McCully (McGraw-Hill, 1968), 160 pp.
- The Look-it-up Book of the Earth, illus. John Polgreen (Random House, 1968), 132 pp.
- Motion, illus. Mehli Gobhai (Coward-McCann, 1968), 45 pp.
- Chip Rogers, Computer Whiz, illus. Steve Miller (William Morrow & Co., 1984) ISBN 0-688-03855-7
- The Dinosaur Is the Biggest Animal That Ever Lived and Other Wrong Ideas You Thought Were True, illus. Giulio Maestro (HarperCollins, 1984) ISBN 0-06-446053-3
- The Moon (Four Winds Press (Scholastic Corp.), 1984), illustrated by photographs of the moon from space, 32 pp.
- Mars (Morrow, 1987) ISBN 0-688-06584-8
- Uranus (Morrow, 1987) ISBN 0-688-06582-1
- How to Be an Ocean Scientist in Your Own Home (HarperCollins, 1988) ISBN 0-397-32292-5
- Storms (Morrow, 1989) ISBN 0688074138
- Whales (HarperCollins, 1989) ISBN 0-06-446095-9
- Oceans (Morrow, 1990) ISBN 0688094546
- Big Cats (HarperCollins, 1991) ISBN 0-06-021647-6
- Earthquakes (Morrow, 1991) ISBN 0-688-09633-6; revised, Smithsonian, 2006
- Neptune (Morrow, 1991) ISBN 0-688-09631-X
- Our Solar System (Morrow, 1992)
- Snakes (HarperCollins, 1992) ISBN 0-06-022529-7
- Wolves (HarperCollins, 1993) ISBN 0-06-022531-9
- Science Dictionary (HarperCollins, 1994) ISBN 0-06-025629-X; revised and updated edition, Dover Publications, 2012, ISBN 0486488659
- The Heart: Our circulatory system (Morrow, 1996) ISBN 0688099920; revised, Smithsonian, 2006
- The Brain: Our nervous system (Morrow, 1997) ISBN 0688146406; revised, Smithsonian, 2006
- Our Solar System, revised edition, edited by Nancy Intelli (HarperCollins, 2014) – forthcoming September 2014
