= Denise Brunkus =

American illustrator

- Occupation: illustrator of children's picture books
- Known for: illustrated more than 60 books
- Notable work: Junie B. Jones series, Read All About It! by Laura and Jenna Bush

Denise Brunkus is an American illustrator of children's picture books. She has illustrated more than 60 books, including the Junie B. Jones series and Read All About It! by Laura and Jenna Bush.

== Early works ==
- The Case of the Wandering Weathervanes: a McGurk mystery, written by E.W. Hildick (Macmillan US, 1988)
- The Principal's New Clothes, Stephanie Calmenson (Scholastic Press, 1989) — adapted from Andersen's 1837 classic, "The Emperor's New Clothes"
- Oliva Sharp series, written by Marjorie W. Sharmat and Mitchell Sharmat, published by Delacorte Press
  - The Pizza Monster (1989)
  - The Princess of the Fillmore Street School (1989)
  - The Sly Spy (1990)
  - The Green Toenails Gang (1991)
- Show and Tell, Elvira Woodruff (Holiday House, 1991)
