= List of Brontë poems =

List of poems written by Charlotte, Emily, Anne and Branwell Brontë

The lists of poems are written by members of the Brontë family.

== Anne Brontë poems ==
- A Reminiscence
- Home
- Lines Composed in a Wood on a Windy Day
- Memory
- Music On Christmas Morning
- Past Days
- The Arbour
- The Consolation
- The Doubter's Prayer
- The Penitent
- To Cowper
- Vanitas Vanitatum Omnia Vanitas

== Branwell Brontë poems ==
- Lines
- On Caroline
- Thorp Green
- Remember Me

== Charlotte Brontë poems ==
- Apostacy
- Early wrapt in slumber deep
- Evening Solace
- Frances
- Life
- Mementos
- On the Death Of Anne Bronte
- Parting
- Passion
- Pilate's Wife's Dream
- Preference
- Presentiment
- Regret
- Speak Of The North! A Lonely Moor
- The Letter
- The Missionary
- The Teacher's Monologue
- The Wife's Will
- The Wood
- Winter Stores

== Emily Brontë poems ==
- A Death-Scene
- A Little While
- Come hither child
- Remembrance
- Day Dream
- F. De Samara to A. G. A.
- Hope (ballad)
- How Clear She Shines
- Heavy hangs the raindrop
- Lines
- Lines (Far away is the land of rest)
- My Comforter
- My Lady's Grave
- Death
- No Coward Soul is Mine
- The Old Stoic
- Self Interrogation
- Shall earth no more inspire thee
- Song for A.A
- Song (1839)
- Song (1846)
- Spellbound
- Stanza
- To a Wreath of Snow
- To Imagination
- The Prisoner
