= Lines Composed in a Wood on a Windy Day =

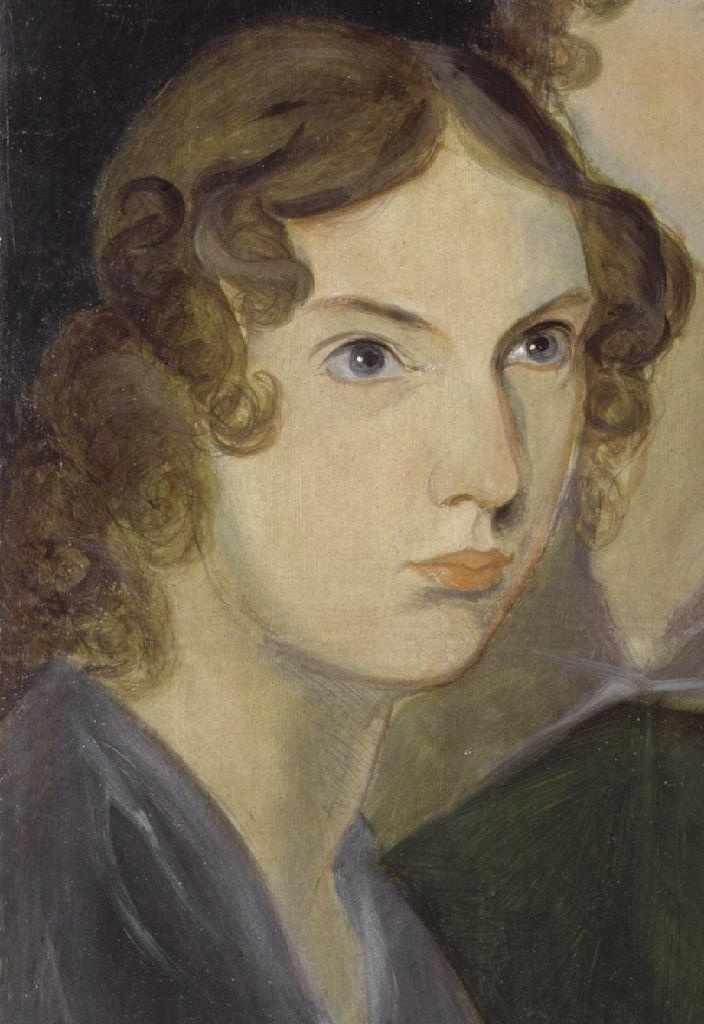
Anne Brontë

"Lines Composed in a Wood on a Windy Day" is a poem by Anne Brontë, the youngest of the three Brontë sisters. It was first published in the collection Poems by Currer, Ellis and Acton Bell (1846). Though it shows some signs of hasty composition the critic Winifred Gérin considered it probably Anne Brontë's finest poem.

== Poem ==
My soul is awakened, my spirit is soaring
And carried aloft on the wings of the breeze;
For above and around me the wild wind is roaring,
Arousing to rapture the earth and the seas.
The long withered grass in the sunshine is glancing,
The bare trees are tossing their branches on high;
The dead leaves beneath them are merrily dancing,
The white clouds are scudding across the blue sky
I wish I could see how the ocean is lashing
The foam of its billows to whirlwinds of spray;
I wish I could see how its proud waves are dashing,
And hear the wild roar of their thunder to-day!

== Analysis ==
Brontë's love of the sea is expressed in this poem. In it, the sea is portrayed as "The Great Liberator".

The line "the long withered grass in the sunshine is glancing" and the footnote she wrote at the bottom of the poem reveals that Brontë "loved wild weather, as she loved the sea, and hard country and snow". The poem further indicates the power and spiritual effect of the wind.

The errors in punctuation on lines five and nine, as well as the erasures before "sunshine" and "above" suggest that the poem was written hastily. One interpretation by Winifred Gérin says that in the poem "emotion and expression have achieved a fusion as felicitous as it is rare in Brontë's writing, is probably the best poem she ever wrote, though not the most characteristic".

== Composition history ==
The poem is based upon an actual experience of Brontë's. A note stating "Composed in the Long-Plantation on a wild bright windy day", was written in Anne Brontë's hand at the bottom of the manuscript and the "Long-Plantation" was identified by Edward Chitham as a wood to the East of Kirby Hall toward the River Ouse, though there is no clear evidence that Long Plantation is a real place. This is about a mile north of Thorp Green.

Brontë, who was then serving as a governess, was influenced, both positively and negatively, as a writer by her time at Thorp Green. She was not able to write often at Thorp Green and so this poem was likely written during, or after a vacation. Her stay at Thorp Green was intended to help her become independent and form for her own philosophies and artistic style, but it may have done the opposite effect, as reflected in this poem.

"Lines Composed in a Wood on a Windy Day" was written at Green Thorpe during Brontë's three-year stay from 1842-1845, and may have been influenced by homesickness. She wrote the poem on 30 December 1842. It was composed during the Victorian Crisis of Faith, a period which played a major role in poems and literature during its time. The meter may have been derived from Thomas Moore's style based on Irish folk song. His poem "I saw from the beach" has four quatrains similar in structure to Lines Composed in a Wood on a Windy Day.

"Lines Composed in a Wood on a Windy Day" was first published in Poems by Currer, Ellis, and Acton Bell, May 1846.

== See also ==
- The Brontës
- List of Brontë poems
