= To a Wreath of Snow =

"To a Wreath of Snow" is a poem written by Emily Brontë in December 1837, the same month her sister Anne Brontë fell ill. It was published posthumously in The Complete Poems of Emily Brontë.

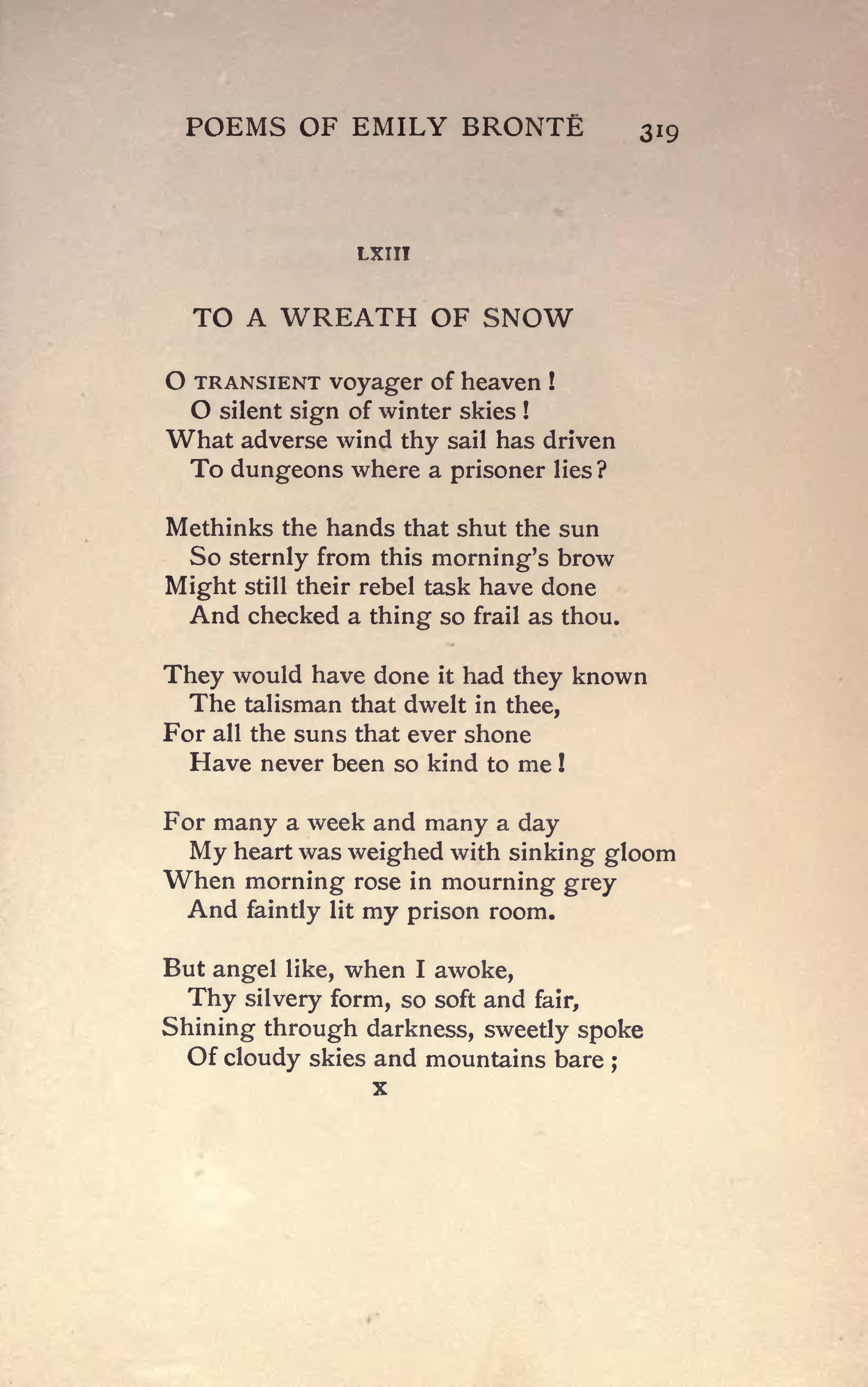
The first five stanzas of the poem.

The poem is made up of seven stanzas of four lines, a total of 28 lines.

== Analysis ==
"To a Wreath of Snow" features Brontë writing from the point of view of the character Augusta Almeda, the Queen of Gondal.
