= A Death-Scene =

Poem by Emily Brontë

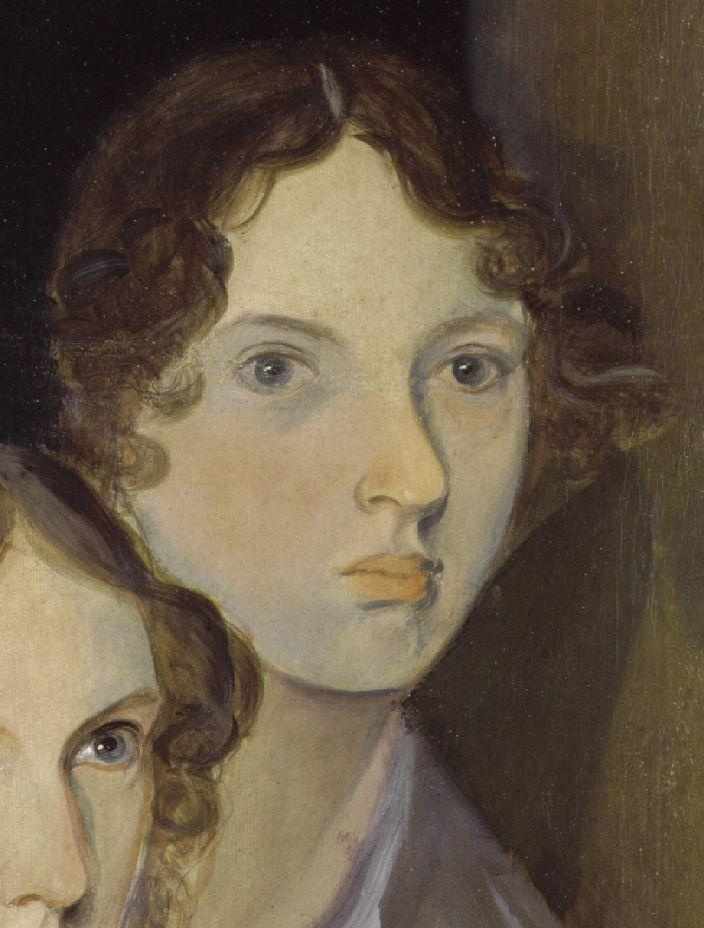
Emily Jane Brontë

"A Death-Scene" is a poem by English writer Emily Brontë. It was written on 2 December 1844 and published in 1846 in a book collecting poetry by Brontë and her siblings.

== Poem excerpt ==
"O Day! he cannot die
When thou so fair art shining!
O Sun, in such a glorious sky,
So tranquilly declining;

He cannot leave thee now,
While fresh west winds are blowing,
And all around his youthful brow
Thy cheerful light is glowing!

Edward, awake, awake—
The golden evening gleams
Warm and bright on Arden's lake—
Arouse thee from thy dreams!["]
...
Then his eyes began to weary,
Weighed beneath a mortal sleep;
And their orbs grew strangely dreary,
Clouded, even as they would weep.

But they wept not, but they changed not,
Never moved, and never closed;
Troubled still, and still they ranged not—
Wandered not, nor yet reposed!

So I knew that he was dying—
Stooped, and raised his languid head;
Felt no breath, and heard no sighing,
So I knew that he was dead.

— Stanzas 1–3 and 11-13

== Context ==
The poem appears to be a Gondal poem from the writing style, but there is nothing in the poem to confirm this theory. The narrator is an anonymous woman. There is no known character by the name of Edward in the Gondal Saga, and the one vague reference to "Arden's lake" is unhelpful because it is not a known place in either the Gondal world or the Glass Town Confederacy.

Gondal was an imaginary world created by Emily and Anne Brontë in their childhood. Initially, all four siblings—Charlotte, Emily, Anne and Branwell—created an imaginary world called "Angria", where each sibling ran an island with a town by the name of "Glasstown". They named it "the Glass Town Confederacy". Later Emily and Anne broke off and created their own world of Gondal. Gondal also had two islands, Gaaldine and Angora. The northern island was the Kingdom of Angora, and was commonly referred to as Gondal. It was a cold region with moorlands and mists. The southern island was Gaaldine, and it was a colony of mainland Gondal. Gaaldine had a more tropical climate, with greenery and sunlight. Gondal is surrounded by choppy seas.

Gondal's most well known character is Queen Augusta Geraldine Almeda (A.G.A.). She has a number of lovers, including Alexander, Lord of Elbe; Alfred Sidonia; and Fernando de Samara, all of whom are killed. There is no record of a lover by the name of Edward.

== Poetic techniques ==
=== Structure ===
The poem has a rhyme pattern of ABAB and stanzas 1–7 are in quotation marks, this could show that Augusta is directly addressing her husband, Edward, as she calls to him with this name.

=== Gondal references ===
The poem uses frequent references to water: "Arden's lake" in stanza 3, "eternal sea" in stanza 4 and "Eden isles" in stanza 6. This water is most probably Emily referring to the water surrounding Gondal. There are other parts of nature that are touched upon in this poem, primarily in stanza 10, these could showing how Augusta is turning to nature to help her cope with the oncoming and unavoidable grief.

== Analysis ==
The poem describes Augusta's sorrow over her dying husband, describing the journey of his final movements. In the second stanza Augusta is trying to convince herself that he will survive, using positive words such as "youthful", "cheerful" and glowing. In the third stanza, she is willing him to awake from his endless sleep. Emily describes the surroundings of the pair as a "golden evening" and the lake as being "warm and bright" – yet more positive imagery.

The fourth stanza shows how close the couple are. True love could be what Augusta is feeling when she describes him as her "dearest friend" and wants "one hour delay" on his fate. In stanza five, Augusta describes the surroundings more with in-depth explanation of the water around them. Here it also appears that she is looking for hope as she is "straining".

Stanza six shows the difference naturally between Gondal and Angria with the high oceans that are "tempestuous" and split the two up. Stanza seven follows a similar format to the third stanza, where Augusta is trying to convince herself that he is not dying. There are feelings of pain where she feels that he is leaving her.

In stanza eight, the scene between the two is described as the pair look at one another: the last look of pain and suffering that "moved" Augusta. In the ninth stanza, she feels she can let go and not feel guilty for no "further grieving". Stanza ten is back to the nature of Gondal. In this stanza the sun mimics what Lord of Elbë, Augusta's husband was doing, "sunk to peace". The setting described here is of the land, not sea, and it appears to be much like the moorland that Emily grew up in.

Using somewhat religious imagery, stanza eleven describes the last few moments of life in the Lord of Elbë. In stanza twelve, seen as it is from Augusta's point of view, confusion seems rife as she uses negatives. However, she does seem proud that her husband did not give in to weeping and wandering. In the thirteenth and final stanza, Augusta appears to come to terms with the death and is able to check his breathing. The frequent punctuation in this stanza heightens the time period that she is with him. The word "languid" shows how limp and lifeless the Lord was at his end, and the last line emphasises this as with the finality of life comes the end of the poem.
