= F. De Samara to A. G. A. =

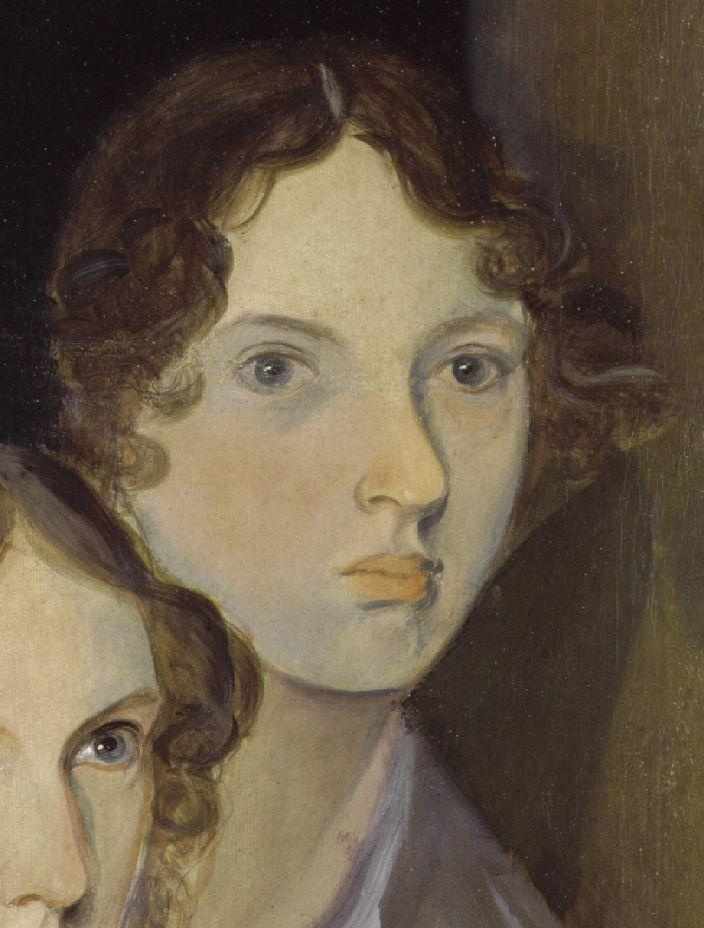
Emily Jane Brontë

F. De Samara to A. G. A. is a poem by British author and poet Emily Jane Brontë, written on November 1, 1838.

== Excerpt ==
Light up thy halls! 'Tis closing day;
I'm drear and lone and far away.
Cold blows on my breast the Northwind's bitter sigh,
And, oh! my couch is bleak, beneath the rainy sky!

Light up thy halls! think not of me;
Absent is that face which thou hast hated so to see;
Bright be thine eyes, undimmed their dazzling shine,
For never, never more shall they encounter mine!
...
How gloomy grows the night! 'Tis Gondal's wind that blows;
I shall not tread again the deep glens where it rose.
I feel it on my face — Where, wild blast! dost thou roam?
What do we, wanderer! here, so far away from home?

I do not need thy breath to cool my death-cold brow;
But go to that far land, where she is shining now;
Tell her my latest wish, tell her my dreary doom;
Say that my pangs are past, but hers are yet to come.

— Stanzas 1, 2, 8, and 9

== Context ==
=== Historical context ===
1838 was a year that saw the UK demand universal suffrage, and the beginning of the Second Central American Civil War. At the time of writing, Emily was two months into her new teaching job at Law Hill girls' school, in Halifax.

=== Gondal references ===
The title of the poem makes reference to two characters from Emily's imaginary childhood island of Gondal, a place which she invented and wrote short stories about along with her younger sister Anne. Gondal was a kingdom ruled by the powerful Queen, Augusta Almeda, to whom the poem is written, from another character, Fernando De Samara. Gondal was often at war with its rival nation Angria – another imaginary island and country, created by Emily and Anne's two siblings Branwell and Charlotte.

When read in this context, F. De Samara to A. G. A. reveals Fernando De Samara's last words to his beloved Queen Augusta, as he commits suicide for her sake.

== Poetic techniques ==
=== Linguistic techniques ===
Suicide, as a theme, is evident also from the use of vivid imagery, as well as the heavy-hearted tone conveyed through Emily's use of caesura and interjection.

=== Structural layout ===
The poem uses thirteen stanzas, constructed using an AABB rhyme scheme. This is a conventional style of writing poetry, upon which Emily's mark can be seen in the way certain lines lack the required rhyme. The effect of this technique is often to draw emphasis to the content of the line, and add impact to that stanza.

== See also ==
- The Brontës
- Poetry
