= Come hither child =

1839 poem by Emily Jane Brontë

"Come hither child" is a poem written by the English poet Emily Jane Brontë, one of the four Brontë siblings famous for literature in the first half of the 19th century. The poem was written on 19 July 1839. It is set in the imaginary realm of Gaaldine, referring to Ula, a province of Gaaldine.

== "Come hither child" by Emily Jane Brontë ==
Come hither child—who gifted thee
With power to touch that string so well?
How daredst thou rouse up thoughts in me
Thoughts that I would—but cannot quell?

Nay chide not lady long ago
I heard those notes in Ula's hall
And had I known they'd waken woe
I'd weep their music to recall

But thus it was one festal night
When I was hardly six years old
I stole away from crowds and light
And sought a chamber dark and cold

I had no one to love me there
I knew no comrade and no friend
And so I went to sorrow where
Heaven only heaven saw me bend

Loud blew the wind 'twas sad to stay
From all that splendour barred away
I imaged in the lonely room
A thousand forms of fearful gloom

And with my wet eyes raised on high
I prayed to God that I might die
Suddenly in that silence drear
A sound of music reached my ear

And then a note I hear it yet
So full of soul so deeply sweet
I thought that Gabriel's self had come
To take me to my father's home

Three times it rose that seraph-strain
Then died nor lived ever again
But still the words and still the tone
Swell round my heart when all alone

== Techniques, motifs and themes ==
"Come hither child" is written in the persona of an unnamed fictional character from Emily's Gaaldine juvenilia. It is written in the first person, recalling a time in their childhood when they felt isolated and lonely in 'Ula's halls'. Thus the main theme of this poem is loneliness (with the line 'I stole away from crowds and light' reflective of the Brontës' own isolation from and seeming awkwardness within society of their era). There is also a strong religious theme to the poem with lines such as 'Heaven only heaven saw me bend' portraying the support the Brontës felt they got from their faith. The poem employs opposites, where the High Romantic notion of sweet innocence is contrasted with age and experience, a theme explored throughout many of Emily Brontë's other poems.

The structure of the poem is conventionally Victorian in its rigidity. The poem seldom digresses from four-line stanzas with an ABAB rhyming pattern and the use of iambic tetrameter. This conforms to the fictitious nature of the poem, since the Brontës seemed more adventurous in their later poetry in which they tended to explore their own emotions more deeply.

However, the poem does involve a time shift, with the protagonist recalling their childhood to an unnamed second person only described as a 'child' who seems to have some musical talent and can play the tune which stimulated the protagonist's memory.

Other techniques used by the poet include alliteration, for example of 'w' in 'waken', 'woe' and 'weep' to create a sorrowful atmosphere. There is also a heavy emphasis on sensory vocabulary, particularly sound with phrases such as 'I hear it yet' and 'still the tone'. There are also religious references throughout, including a reference to the angel Gabriel.
