= Thomas Cautley Newby =

English publisher and printer

Thomas Cautley Newby (1797/1798 – 1882) was an English publisher and printer based in London.

Newby published Wuthering Heights by Emily Brontë and both Anne Brontë's novels, Agnes Grey and The Tenant of Wildfell Hall. He also published Anthony Trollope's first novel, The Macdermots of Ballycloran (1847).
