= Poems by Currer, Ellis, and Acton Bell =

1846 book by Charlotte, Emily, and Anne Brontë

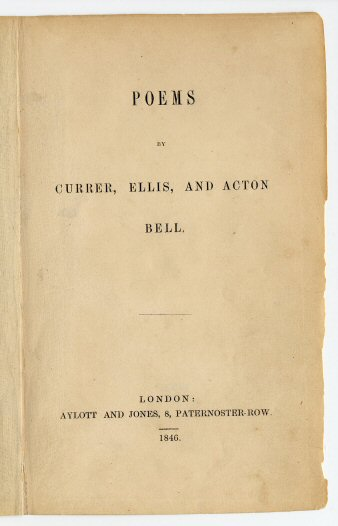
- Title page of the first edition, 1846
- Authors: Charlotte Brontë; Emily Brontë; Anne Brontë
- Language: English
- Genre: poetry
- Publisher: Aylott and Jones
- Publication date: 1846 (first issue), 1848 (second issue)
- Publication place: London

Poems by Currer, Ellis, and Acton Bell is a book of poetry published by Aylott and Jones of London featuring the work of the three Brontë sisters, Charlotte, Emily, and Anne in 1846 (see 1846 in poetry), and their first work in print. To evade the contemporary prejudice against female writers and to preserve their privacy, Charlotte became Currer Bell, Emily became Ellis Bell, and Anne became Acton Bell.

== After publication ==
The book was not a success. Charlotte wrote in a letter that "in the space of a year our publisher has disposed but of two copies", although others were sent out for review and as gifts. Leonard Huxley wrote that by 1915 there were only "six or seven" copies with the Aylott and Jones title page still in existence. The unsold, unbound sheets were eventually acquired by Charlotte's publisher Smith, Elder & Co., which released them in 1848 with a new title page (but still bearing the original date of 1846). Apart from the title page and an errata slip, this volume is internally identical to the one released by Aylott and Jones, and is known as the second issue of the first edition.

Smith, Elder did, however, bind its copies attractively in green cloth, with gold lettering and embossed decoration — unlike the anonymous binding (with a blank spine) used by Aylott and Jones, who were primarily stationers rather than publishers. Thanks to its visual appeal — one reviewer suggested "it would make a charming little Christmas gift" — and more especially to the success of Jane Eyre, Wuthering Heights and Agnes Grey, all published in 1847, the Smith, Elder incarnation fared better than the original, without ever becoming a best-seller. Nevertheless, the sisters were now famous enough to justify an American edition, published by Lea and Blanchard of Philadelphia, also in 1848.

Emily and Anne died in 1848 and 1849 respectively. Always eager to promote her sisters' literary legacy, Charlotte included an expanded selection of their poems in the second edition of Wuthering Heights and Agnes Grey, which appeared in 1850 (the two relatively short novels were initially published together to create a three-decker). While Charlotte's intention was to introduce her sisters' verse to a wider audience, she inadvertently established a precedent for treating the Brontës' poetry as a supplement to their fiction, only occasionally meriting separate publication in its own right. (This partly reflected the general decline in the marketability of poetry as a genre in the post-Byron era.) The seven-volume The Life and Work of Charlotte Bronte and Her Sisters, in print continuously from the 1870s to the 1930s, included the poems in the volume containing Charlotte's novel The Professor.

The Brontës' poetry did not appear in authoritative editions until the twentieth century, first in the series of Complete Poems — Anne (1921), Charlotte (1923), Emily (1923) — edited by C. W. Hatfield and Clement Shorter and published by Hodder and Stoughton in the United Kingdom and by George H. Doran in the United States; then in the two poetry volumes of The Shakespeare Head Brontë, one devoted to Charlotte and Branwell and the other to Emily and Anne, published by Basil Blackwell in 1934.

== See also ==
- List of Brontë poems
