= Winifred Gérin =

English biographer (1901–1981)

Winifred Eveleen Gérin OBE, née Bourne, (7 October 1901 – 28 June 1981) was an English biographer born in Hamburg. She is best known as a biographer of the Brontë sisters and their brother Branwell, whose lives she researched extensively. Charlotte Brontë: the Evolution of Genius (1967) is regarded as her seminal work and received the James Tait Black Memorial Prize, the Rose Mary Crawshay Prize and the Royal Society of Literature Heinemann prize.

== Family ==
Winifred was the daughter of Frederick Charles Bourne (1859–1928) and Katherine née Hill (1859-1943), a great-granddaughter of Sir Hugh Hill, 1st Baronet Hill of Brook Hall. Her parents met when her father was a manager for the chemical company Nobel Industries in Hamburg and her mother was working there as a governess. They married in Hamburg and Winifred and her two elder brothers, Charles Philip Bourne (1897–?) and Roger Hereward Bourne (1898–1979) were all born there. Her first husband, Eugène Jules Telesphore Gérin (1896–1945) was a Belgian cellist whom she first heard playing at a concert in Cannes. Winifred spoke fluent French and German and, during the Second World War she worked for the political intelligence department of the British Foreign Office. Eugène died in 1945 and, later Winifred met John Lock. They married in 1955 and lived together at Haworth, he was the co-author, with Canon W T Dixon, of "A Man of Sorrow: The Life, Letters, and Times of the Rev. Patrick Brontë".

== Education ==
- Sydenham High School for Girls
- Newnham College, Cambridge (graduated 1923)

== Awards and distinctions ==
- James Tait Black Memorial Prize (1967)
- Rose Mary Crawshay Prize (1967)
- Royal Society of Literature Heinemann prize (1967)
- Fellow of the Royal Society of Literature (1968)
- OBE (1975)

== Works ==
- Anne Brontë, Thomas Nelson, 1959
- Branwell Brontë, Thomas Nelson, 1961
- The young Fanny Burney, Thomas Nelson, 1961
- Charlotte Brontë : the evolution of genius, Clarendon, 1967
- Horatia Nelson, Clarendon, 1970
- Emily Brontë : a biography Clarendon, 1971
- The Brontës, Longman, 1973
- Elizabeth Gaskell : a biography, Clarendon, 1976
- Anne Thackeray Ritchie : a biography, Oxford University Press, 1981

Awards and achievements
Preceded by	Rose Mary Crawshay Prize; 1967	Succeeded by Kate Flint; Ruth Smith
