= Fannie Ratchford =

American librarian and scholar

Fannie Elizabeth Ratchford (1887–1974) was an American librarian and scholar of 19th century English literature.

== Life and education ==
Ratchford was born in Paint Rock, Texas on June 5, 1887. She attended the universities of Texas and Kansas and graduated from Texas with a BA in 1919 and a master's degree in 1921. Ratchford died in Austin, Texas on February 9, 1974.

== Career ==
Ratchford spent her entire working life in the rare book collections of the University of Texas, from 1919 until retirement in 1957. She became a specialist in the miniature manuscripts of Charlotte Brontë and Branwell Brontë, and assisted in the Oxford edition of the complete works of the Brontës. She also published on Timothy Shelley.

Ratchford played a significant role in the controversy over Thomas J Wise, the London book dealer who had forged many of the items he had sold to the wealthy collector John Henry Wrenn whose collection formed the nucleus of the University of Texas rare book collection that would become the Harry Ransom Center. She also demonstrated that many of the Texas books contained leaves which had been stolen from the British Museum.

Ratchford was a supporter of fine printing in Texas.

== Honours and awards ==
Ratchford was awarded Guggenheim fellowships for 1929–30, 1939–40, and 1957–58, and a Laura Spelman Rockefeller research fellowships for 1934–36. She was awarded an honorary LL.D. from Western College for Women in Oxford, Ohio in 1954. Ratchford's edition of From Texas to Mexico and the Court of Maximilian in 1865 was named one of the "fifty books of the year" by the American Institute of Graphic Arts.

== Selected publications ==
=== Brontë manuscripts ===
- Legends of Angria (1933), written with William Clyde DeVane
- The Brontës' Web of Childhood (1941)
- Editor, Emily Brontë's Gondal's Queen (1955)

=== Thomas J Wise Affair ===
- Letters of Thomas J. Wise to John Henry Wrenn: A Further Inquiry into the Guilt of Certain Nineteenth-Century Forgers (1944)
- Between the Lines: Letters and Memoranda Interchanged by H. Buxton Forman and Thomas J. Wise (1945).

=== Other ===
- Some Reminiscences of Persons and Incidents of the Civil War (1909)

=== Fine printing editions ===
- A. W. Terrell's From Texas to Mexico and the Court of Maximilian in 1865
