= Emily Brontë =

English writer and novelist (1818–1848)

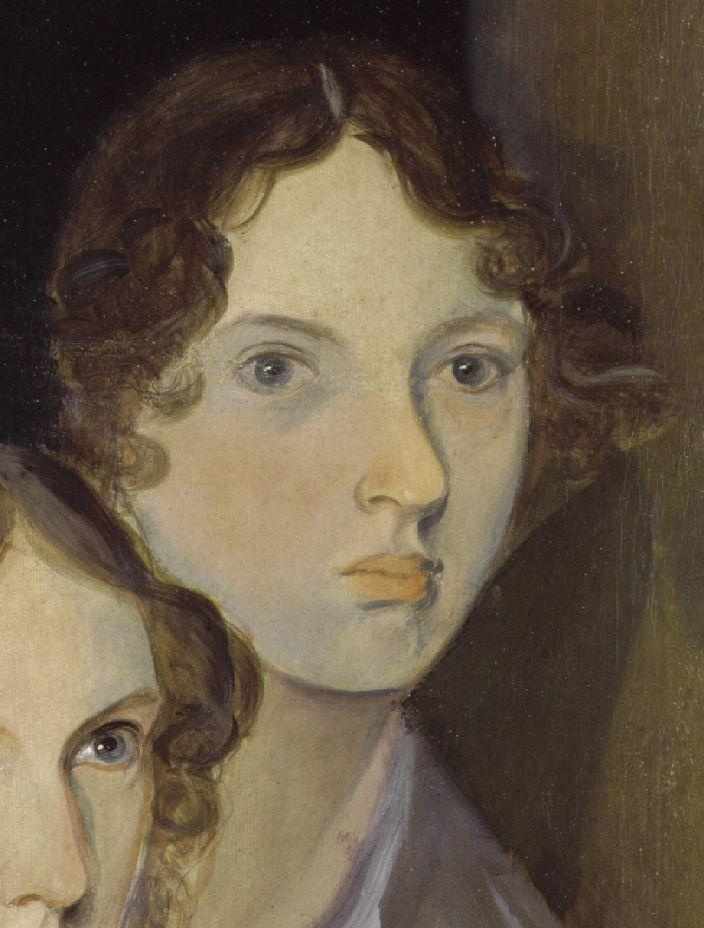
- Detail of Emily Brontë, from a painting by her brother, Branwell, c. 1834
- Born: Emily Jane Brontë; 30 July 1818; Thornton, Yorkshire, England
- Died: 19 December 1848 (aged 30); Haworth, Bradford, West Yorkshire, England
- Resting place: St Michael and All Angels' Church, Haworth, Yorkshire, England
- Education: Cowan Bridge School
- Occupations: Poet; novelist; governess
- Parent(s): Patrick Brontë; Maria Branwell
- Relatives: Brontë family
- Writing career
- Pen name: Ellis Bell
- Period: 1846–48
- Genres: Fiction; poetry
- Notable work: Wuthering Heights
- Movement: Romantic Period
- Works related to Emily Brontë at Wikisource

Emily Jane Brontë (/ˈbrɒnti/, commonly /-teɪ/; 30 July 1818 – 19 December 1848) was an English writer best known for her 1847 novel Wuthering Heights. She also co-authored a book of poetry with her sisters Charlotte and Anne entitled Poems by Currer, Ellis, and Acton Bell.

Emily was the fifth of six Brontë siblings, four of whom survived into adulthood. Her mother, Maria Branwell, died when she was three, leaving the children in the care of their aunt, Elizabeth Branwell. Apart from brief intervals at school, Emily was mostly taught at home by her father, Patrick Brontë, who was the curate of Haworth. She was very close to her siblings, especially her younger sister Anne, and together they wrote books and journals depicting imaginary worlds named Glass Town, Angria and Gondal. She was described by her sister Charlotte as solitary, strong-willed and nonconforming, with a keen love of nature and animals.

Apart from a brief period at school, and another as a student and teacher in Brussels with her sister Charlotte, Emily spent most of her life at home in Haworth, helping the family servant with chores, playing the piano and teaching herself from books.

Her work was originally published under the pen name Ellis Bell. It was not generally admired at the time, and many critics felt that the characters in Wuthering Heights were coarse and immoral. In spite of this, the novel is considered a classic of English literature. Emily Brontë died in 1848, aged 30, a year after the novel's publication.

== Early life ==
Emily Brontë was born on 30 July 1818 to Maria Branwell, the daughter of a wealthy Penzance merchant and property owner, and Patrick Brontë, a curate from an impoverished Irish family. The Brontë family lived in Market Street, in Thornton, a village on the outskirts of Bradford, in the West Riding of Yorkshire. Their house is now open to the public and is known as the Brontë Birthplace.

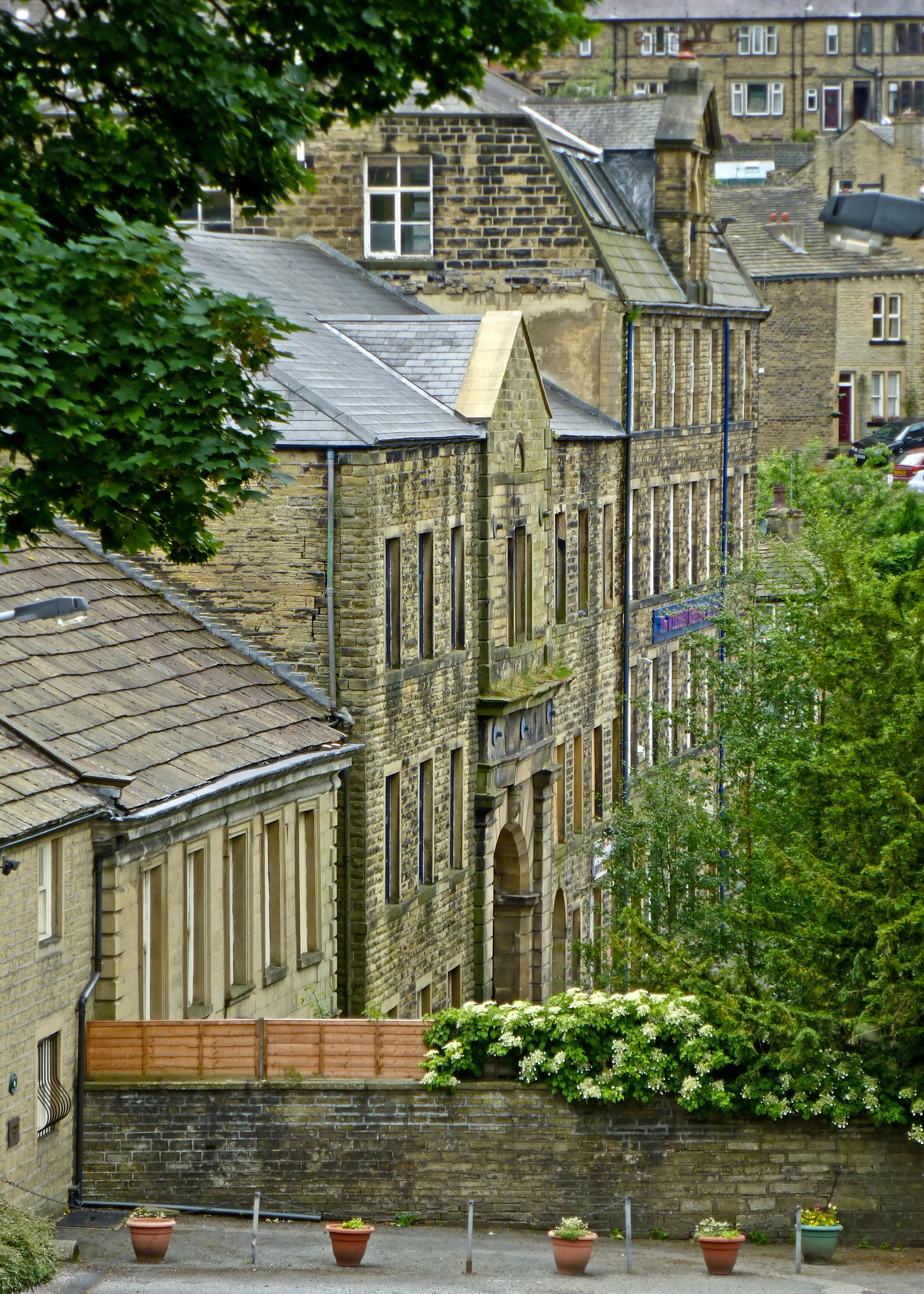
Haworth in 2013

Emily was the fifth of six siblings, preceded by Maria, Elizabeth, Charlotte and Branwell. In 1820, Anne, the last Brontë child, was born. Soon after Anne's birth, the family moved 12 miles (19 km) away to the village of Haworth, in the Pennines, where Patrick Brontë took employment as perpetual curate. Haworth was a small community with an unusually high early mortality rate. In 1850, Benjamin Herschel Babbage reported deeply insanitary conditions, including contamination to the village water supply from the overcrowded graveyard nearby. This is believed to have had a serious impact on the health of Emily and her siblings.

On 15 September 1821, Maria Branwell died, after a long illness which her nurse believed to have been uterine cancer. Her sister, Elizabeth Branwell, had joined the household to nurse her, and made the move permanent to care for the three-year-old Emily and her siblings. Elizabeth Branwell was not especially maternal, taking her meals alone, as did Patrick Brontë. She is portrayed as a stern disciplinarian in Elizabeth Gaskell's biography of Charlotte Brontë, but Nick Holland states in his biography of her that she also had an affectionate and supportive side.

=== Cowan Bridge school ===
In 1824, Emily and her three elder sisters were sent to the newly opened Clergy Daughters' School at Cowan Bridge. At her admission, the school register said of Emily that she "reads very prettily, and works a little". At six years old, she was the youngest student, and the superintendent described her as "quite the pet nursling of the school". The children suffered severe privations at Cowan Bridge, including poor and insufficient food, unsanitary conditions, harsh discipline and frequent outbreaks of infectious disease such as typhoid and tuberculosis. In 1825, following an outbreak of typhoid fever, Maria and Elizabeth both fell ill, and were sent home, where they died of tuberculosis within three months of one other. After this, Charlotte and Emily were brought back to Haworth by their father. The children were subsequently educated at home, and were cared for by their aunt Elizabeth Branwell, who had given up her plans to return to Penzance, and the house servant, Tabby Ackroyd.

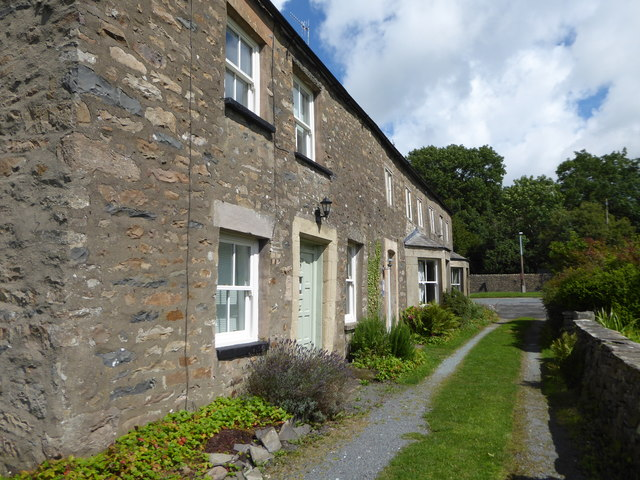
Cowan Bridge School, now known as "The Brontë School"

=== Early influences ===
The Brontë children were encouraged by their father and aunt to develop their literary talents and to take an interest in politics and current affairs. Girls were not allowed access to the public library, but Branwell borrowed books which he shared with his sisters, and Patrick Brontë had a large personal library, to which he allowed his children access. Thus Emily and her siblings read a wide range of published material, including books, periodicals and magazines. Favourites included: Aesop's Fables, the Arabian Nights, Walter Scott's Tales of a Grandfather and Blackwood's Magazine, as well as Oliver Goldsmith's A History of England and J. Goldsmith's A Grammar of General Geography. In 1833 or 1834 Patrick Brontë bought a piano, and Emily became proficient in its use. The Brontë children were also tutored in drawing and painting, as well as in Latin and Classics. They were familiar with the work of Thomas Bewick and John Martin, the engravings of William Finden, and illustrations from The Literary Souvenir. Twenty-nine drawings and paintings by Emily are known to have survived, including a watercolour painting of her dog, Keeper.

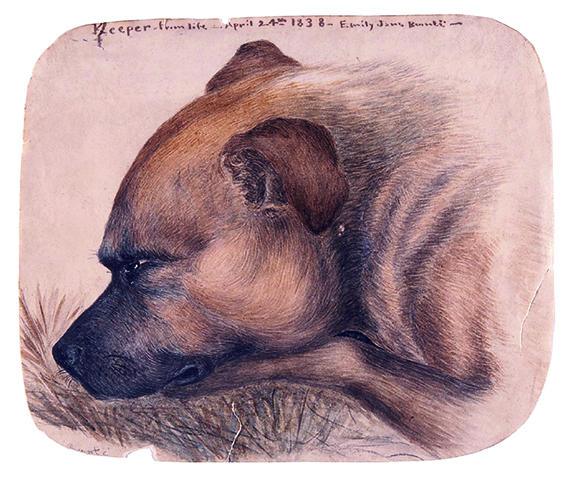
Watercolour painting by Emily Brontë of her dog Keeper, dated 1838

In spite of his desire for his children to receive as comprehensive an education as possible, Patrick Brontë himself was cold and emotionally distant, and exhibited a number of marked eccentricities, such as carrying a loaded gun at all times and imposing a number of idiosyncratic personal rules on the household. Elizabeth Gaskell's biography of Charlotte depicts him as prone to violent rages, once cutting up a dress belonging to his wife because he felt it encouraged vanity, and forbidding his children to eat meat in case it made them too dependent on their physical comfort, although Patrick himself denied this, and Gaskell's account is now generally considered to have been an exaggeration. He had retained an Irish accent, which the siblings shared as children, and this contributed to the perception that they were outsiders, never quite fitting into the Yorkshire community. A local woman later told Elizabeth Gaskell that the Brontë children had no friends in the village, and on one occasion when they were invited to a party, showed no knowledge of the games played by their peers. Left to their own devices, the siblings were unusually close, and remained so, especially Emily and Anne, who were described by a family friend, Ellen Nussey, as being "like twins".

=== Juvenilia ===
Inspired by a box of toy soldiers Branwell Brontë had received as a gift from his father, the children began to write stories, which they set in the complex imaginary worlds of Glass Town and Angria. These stories, which became increasingly detailed, were initially populated by these soldiers (referred to by the children as "The Young Men", or "the Twelves") as well as their real-life heroes, the Duke of Wellington and his sons, Charles and Arthur Wellesley. The siblings created tiny books for the soldiers to "read", some of which are on display at the Brontë Parsonage in Haworth, and, in December 1827 they produced a novel, Glass Town. Little of Emily's work from this period survives, except for poems spoken by characters.

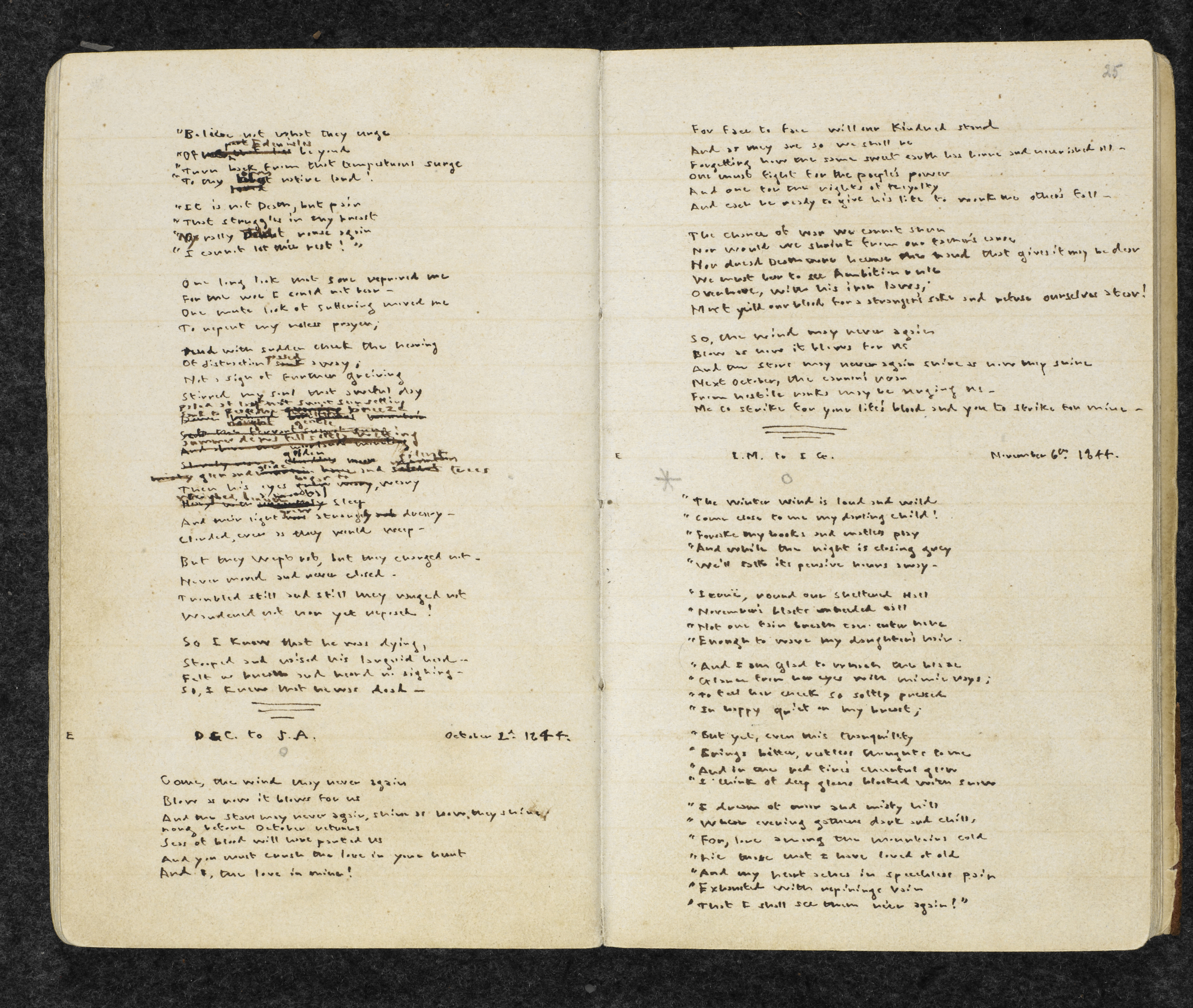
Emily's Gondal poems

When Emily was thirteen, she and Anne withdrew from participation in the Angria story and began a new one about Gondal, a fictional island whose myths and legends were to preoccupy the two sisters throughout their lives. With the exception of their Gondal poems and Anne's lists of Gondal's characters and place names, Emily and Anne's Gondal writings were largely not preserved. Among those that did survive are some "diary papers", written by Emily in her twenties, which describe current events in Gondal. The heroes of Gondal tended to resemble the popular image of the Scottish Highlander, a sort of British version of the "noble savage". The tales of Gondal also feature a queen called Augusta Geraldine Almeda, whose character bears some similarities with that of Catherine Earnshaw in Wuthering Heights. Similar themes of romanticism and noble savagery are apparent across the Brontës' juvenilia, including in Branwell's The Life of Alexander Percy, which tells the story of an all-consuming, death-defying, and ultimately self-destructive love, and which some believe may have been one of the inspirations for Wuthering Heights.

== Adulthood ==
=== Attempted teaching career ===
At seventeen, Emily joined the Roe Head Girls' School, where Charlotte was a teacher. This was the first time Emily had attended school since her few months at Cowan Bridge. At this time, the girls' objective was to obtain sufficient education to open a small school of their own. Emily struggled to adapt to life at Roe Head and left after only a few months, with Anne taking her place. Later, Charlotte ascribed this to Emily's extreme homesickness and resistance to the routine and discipline of the school, stating that she feared Emily would have died if she had not been allowed home.

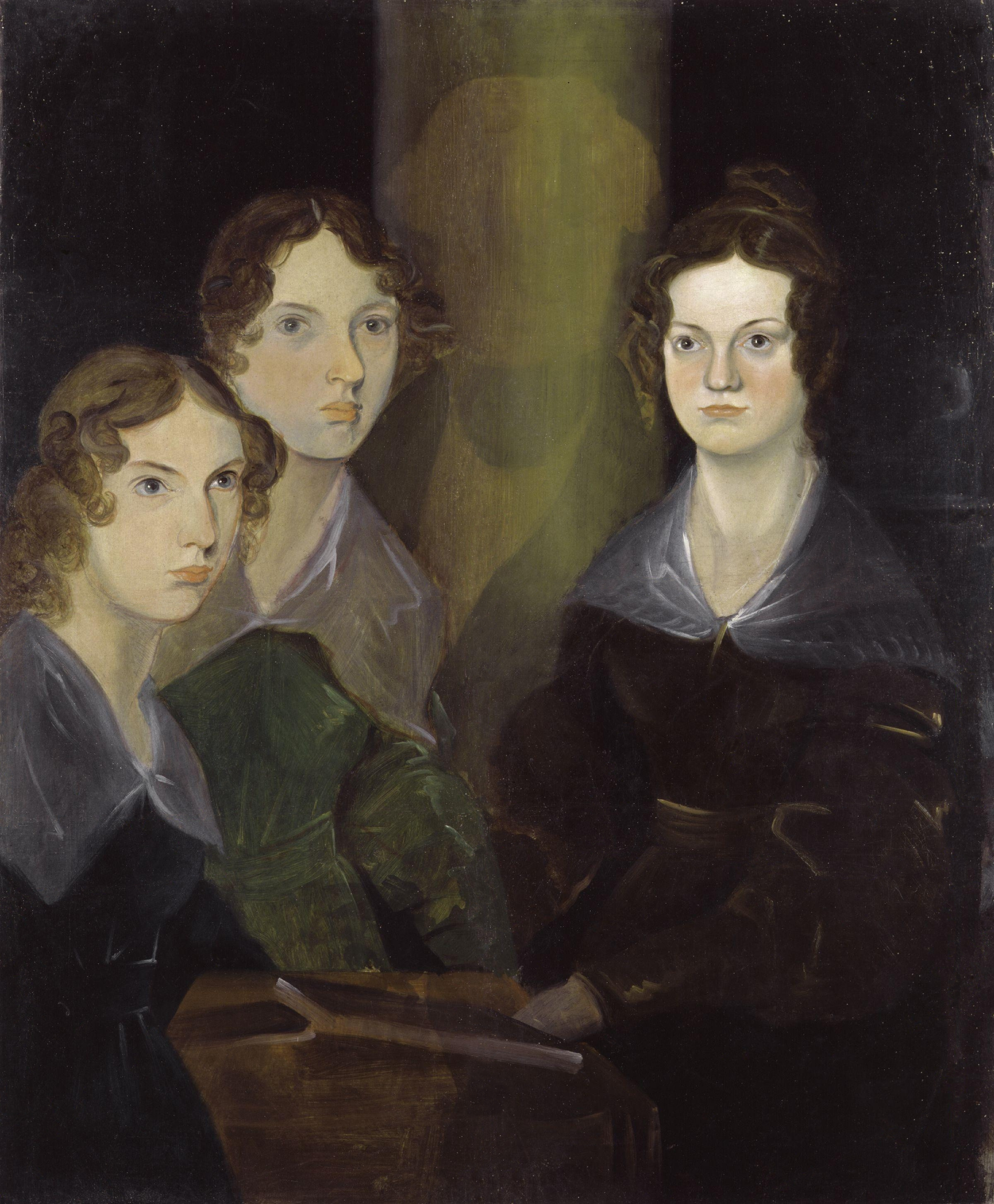
The three Brontë sisters, in an 1834 painting by their brother Branwell Brontë. From left to right: Anne, Emily and Charlotte. (Branwell used to be between Emily and Charlotte, but subsequently painted himself out.)

In September 1838, when she was twenty, Emily became a teacher at Law Hill School, in the Yorkshire town of Halifax. Her health suffered under the stress of the seventeen-hour workday, and she did not warm to her pupils, stating that she preferred the company of the house dog. She did, however, continue writing, and produced several poems during this time. She returned home to Haworth in April 1839, helping the family's servant with the cooking, ironing, and cleaning. She taught herself German from books and played the piano, becoming an accomplished pianist, as well as continuing to expand her Gondal stories. These survive as a series of poems, many of which reflect her interest in the tragic, Byronic figures that precede the creation of Heathcliff.

=== Brussels ===
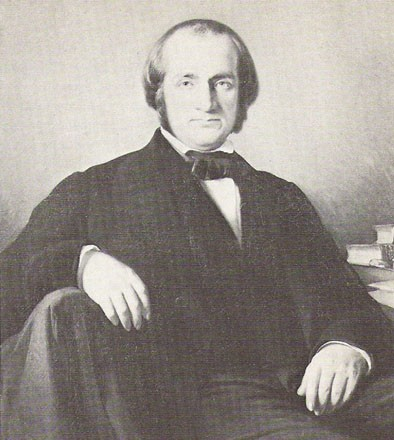
Constantin Heger, teacher of Charlotte and Emily during their stay in Brussels, on a daguerreotype dated c. 1865

In 1842, when she was twenty-four, Emily accompanied Charlotte to study at the Heger Pensionnat, a girls' boarding school in Brussels, where Charlotte hoped to spend six months improving her French, Italian and German. Charlotte's further plan was for them to seek employment abroad, although she only shared this plan with Emily. Their tuition and travel expenses had been paid by their Aunt Branwell, and some friends of the family, the Jenkinses, had promised to look out for their well-being. The Jenkins family were initially welcoming but soon ceased to invite the sisters, finding Charlotte to be socially awkward and Emily monosyllabic.

Nor did Charlotte and Emily fit in easily at the school: they were considerably older than their peers, they struggled with lessons that were held in French, and they were in a very small minority of Protestants in the Pensionnat. Unlike Charlotte, who made an effort to be accepted, and changed her style of dress to fit in better with her peers, Emily was not happy in Brussels and was mocked by the other students for her refusal to adopt Belgian fashions. A fellow-student, Laetitia Wheelwright, said of her:

I simply disliked her from the first; her tallish, ungainly, ill-dressed figure ... always answering our jokes with 'I wish to be as God made me'.

Constantin Heger, who was in charge of the academy, thought highly of Emily, later telling Mrs Gaskell that he rated her intellect as "something even higher" than Charlotte's, saying:

She should have been a man – a great navigator. Her powerful reason would have deduced new spheres of discovery from the knowledge of the old; and her strong imperious will would never have been daunted by opposition or difficulty, never have given way but with life. She had a head for logic, and a capability of argument unusual in a man and rarer indeed in a woman... impairing this gift was her stubborn tenacity of will which rendered her obtuse to all reasoning where her own wishes, or her own sense of right, was concerned.

Fewer than a dozen of Emily's French essays survive from this period, most of which are compositions based on existing literary works selected by Constantin Heger. The two sisters were committed to their studies and by the end of the term had become so competent in French that Madame Heger, the wife of Constantin Heger, proposed that they both stay another half-year. According to Charlotte, she even offered to dismiss the English master so that Charlotte could take his place. By this time, Emily had become a competent pianist and teacher, and it was suggested that she might stay on to teach music. Emily had a particular admiration for the music of Ludwig van Beethoven whose sonatas she played and studied the most at the piano. In this way, the sisters would be able to continue their education at the Pensionnat without paying for their board or tuition. Emily's first students in Brussels were the three young daughters of a local family, the Wheelwrights. The family liked Charlotte, but disliked Emily intensely. Laetitia Wheelwright later said that this was because Emily refused to teach the small children during her own school hours, thereby monopolizing their play time. In spite of this, Emily seems to have been happier during this period, and even made a friend; a sixteen-year-old Belgian student, Louise de Bassompierre, to whom Emily gifted a signed drawing.

Unfortunately, the sudden illness and death of their aunt, Elizabeth Branwell, forced the sisters' return to Haworth. A letter from Constantin Heger to Patrick Brontë, appealing for the girls to remain, reveals that Emily was about to receive music lessons from a celebrated teacher, and was finally overcoming her social awkwardness. In spite of this, she remained in Haworth to take over the running of the household, while Charlotte returned to Brussels without her. In 1844, on Charlotte's return, the sisters attempted to open a school at the Parsonage, but the venture failed when they proved unable to attract students to the remote area.

=== Poetry publications ===
In February 1844, Emily began going through all the poems she had written, recopying them into two notebooks. One notebook was labelled "Gondal Poems"; the other was unlabelled. Scholars such as Fannie Ratchford and Derek Roper have attempted to piece together a Gondal storyline and chronology from these poems. In the autumn of 1845, Charlotte discovered the notebooks and insisted that the poems be published. Emily, furious at the invasion of her privacy, at first refused but, according to Charlotte, relented when Anne brought out her own manuscripts and revealed that she too had been writing poems in secret. Around this time, Emily wrote one of her most famous poems, "No coward soul is mine". Some literary critics have speculated that it is a poem about Anne Brontë, while others see it as a response to the violation of her privacy. Charlotte later claimed that it was Emily's final poem, but this is inaccurate. Although it was the last poem to be transcribed into Emily's fair copy notebook, she continued to write poetry, but channelled most of her creative energy into prose.

In 1846, the sisters' poems were published, at their own expense, by a small London publisher called Aylott & Jones. The poems appeared together in one volume, entitled Poems by Currer, Ellis, and Acton Bell. On the insistence of Emily and Anne, the Brontë sisters adopted pseudonyms for publication, preserving their initials: thus Charlotte was "Currer Bell", Emily was "Ellis Bell" and Anne was "Acton Bell". Charlotte wrote in the 'Biographical Notice of Ellis and Acton Bell' that their "ambiguous choice" was "dictated by a sort of conscientious scruple at assuming Christian names positively masculine, while we did not like to declare ourselves women, because... we had a vague impression that authoresses are liable to be looked on with prejudice". Charlotte contributed nineteen poems, and Emily and Anne each contributed twenty-one, with Emily making adjustments to some of her contributions to conceal their Gondal origins.

Although the sisters were told several months after publication that only two copies of the book had sold, they were not discouraged (of their two readers, one was impressed enough to request their autographs). A reviewer in The Athenaeum praised Ellis Bell's work for its music and power, singling out those poems as the best in the book: "Ellis possesses a fine, quaint spirit and an evident power of wing that may reach heights not here attempted", and The Critic reviewer recognised "the presence of more genius than it was supposed this utilitarian age had devoted to the loftier exercises of the intellect." Following Charlotte's unsuccessful attempts to generate further interest in the poems, she sent copies of the book to celebrated poets such as William Wordsworth, Alfred Tennyson, Hartley Coleridge, Thomas De Quincey and Ebenezer Elliott. She then announced to Aylott & Jones that "C, E & A Bell are now preparing for the Press a work of fiction – consisting of three distinct and unconnected tales which may be published either together as work of 3 vols of the ordinary novel-size, or separately as single vols." The three novels to which she referred were The Professor, Wuthering Heights and Agnes Grey.

== Wuthering Heights ==
Emily Brontë's Wuthering Heights was first published in London by Thomas Cautley Newby, shortly after the publication and immediate success in October 1847 of Charlotte Brontë's Jane Eyre, which was published by Smith, Elder & Co. Thomas Newby, who had been very slow to deal with Emily and Anne, finally saw the advantage of using the family connection, and published Wuthering Heights in December 1847. The novel appeared as the first two volumes of a three-volume set that also included Anne Brontë's Agnes Grey. The authors were named as Ellis and Acton Bell; Emily's real name did not appear until after her death in 1848, when it was printed on the title page of an edited commercial edition.

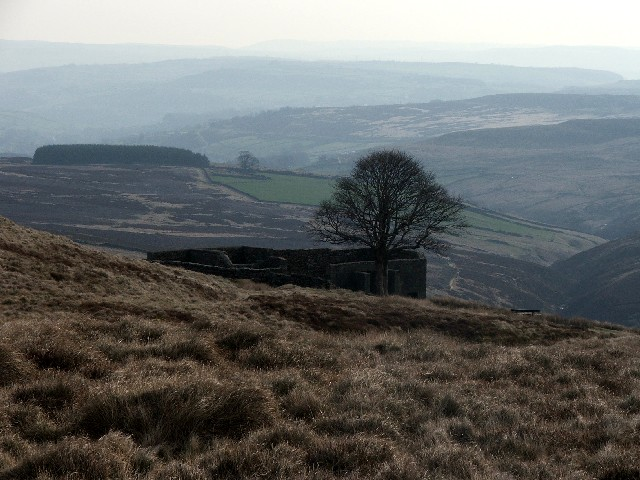
Top Withens farm, believed by many to be the inspiration for Wuthering Heights

The novel, a Gothic story of doomed love, hate, revenge and the supernatural, deals with the relationships of various couples in and around the farmhouse of the title. In spite of its Yorkshire setting, the novel owes much to Emily's Gondal writings, as well as to Walter Scott's Rob Roy. Critics were puzzled by the novel's unusual structure, and its violence and passion led the Victorian public and many early reviewers to assume that it had been written by a man. According to Juliet Gardiner, "the vivid sexual passion and power of its language and imagery impressed, bewildered and appalled reviewers." The literary critic Thomas Joudrey further contextualises this reaction: "Expecting in the wake of Charlotte Brontë's Jane Eyre to be swept up in an earnest Bildungsroman, they were instead shocked and confounded by a tale of unchecked primal passions, replete with savage cruelty and outright barbarism." One of the novel's first critics, writing in January 1848 for the periodical Atlas, described all the characters in the novel as being: "utterly hateful or thoroughly contemptible", and an anonymous reviewer in The Examiner also wrote in 1848:

This is a strange book. It is not without evidences of considerable power: but, as a whole, it is wild, confused, disjointed, and improbable; and the people who make up the drama, which is tragic enough in its consequences, are savages ruder than those who lived before the days of Homer.

Some even went as far as to dispute the novel's authorship. Emily herself had insisted on maintaining her pseudonym to protect her privacy, and when, after her death, she was named by Charlotte as the author of Wuthering Heights, two of Branwell Brontë's friends claimed that Branwell was the true author of the novel. An anonymous article followed in People's Magazine expressing incredulity that such a work could have been written by "a timid and retiring female".

Although a letter from her publisher addressed to Ellis Bell indicates that Emily had begun to write a second novel, the manuscript has never been found. It has been suggested either that it was destroyed, or that the letter was intended for Anne Brontë, who was already writing The Tenant of Wildfell Hall.

== Personality and character ==
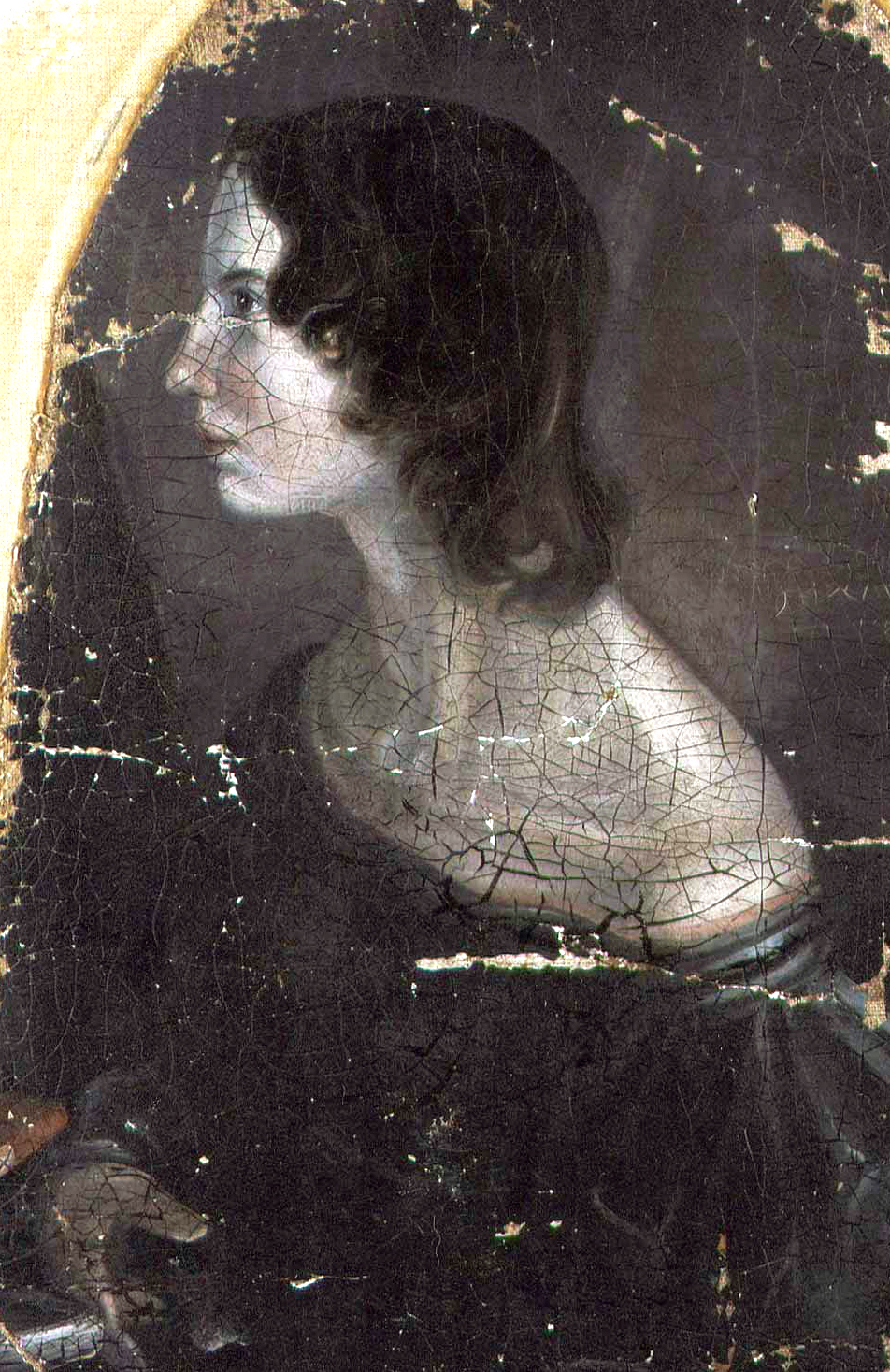
Portrait painted by Branwell Brontë in 1833 (sources disagree over whether this image is of Emily or Anne)

Unlike Charlotte, who left a wealth of correspondence, very few of Emily's letters have survived. This, combined with her solitary nature, has made her a challenge for biographers to assess.

=== Charlotte's representation of Emily ===
According to Lucasta Miller's analysis of Brontë biographies, Charlotte "took on the role of Emily's first mythographer." Stevie Davies writes about what she calls "Charlotte's smoke-screen", and argues that Charlotte was shocked by Emily, and may even have doubted her sister's sanity. She was in awe of Emily's genius – at one point referring to her as "a giant" and "a baby god", but seems never to have fully understood her work, describing her in the introduction to Wuthering Heights as: "a native and nursling of the moors", who "did not know what she had done". After Emily's death, Charlotte reshaped her character, history and even some of her poems, in a way that she hoped might be more acceptable to the public, representing Emily as a kind of noble savage of the Yorkshire moors, "stronger than a man, simpler than a child". In the Preface to the Second Edition of Wuthering Heights in 1850, she writes:

My sister's disposition was not naturally gregarious; circumstances favoured and fostered her tendency to seclusion; except to go to church or take a walk on the hills, she rarely crossed the threshold of home. Though her feeling for the people round was benevolent, intercourse with them she never sought; nor, with very few exceptions, ever experienced. And yet she knew them: knew their ways, their language, their family histories; she could hear of them with interest, and talk of them with detail, minute, graphic, and accurate; but WITH them, she rarely exchanged a word.

=== Friends ===
With the exception of Ellen Nussey and Louise de Bassompierre, Emily's fellow student in Brussels, there is no record of Emily having had friends outside her family. There is no evidence that Emily was ever in love, or that the passionate relationships depicted in Wuthering Heights were based on personal experience. Emily's closest friend was her sister Anne. Inseparable in childhood, they shared their own fantasy world, Gondal, into adulthood.

=== Gaskell's biography of Charlotte ===
Elizabeth Gaskell's biography, The Life of Charlotte Brontë, was the first, most influential source of information about Emily. In it Gaskell describes Emily as unusually tall and slim, often wearing a purple dress, and exercising an 'unconscious tyranny' over her sisters, who nicknamed her 'the Major'. She also recounts a number of anecdotes which represent Emily as unpredictable, even violent on occasion, including one of Emily's violently punishing her dog Keeper for climbing with muddy paws on one of the beds in the Parsonage, after which she comforted and bathed him. However, as Charlotte was Gaskell's primary source of information, the biography is not considered to be an impartial account, especially as Gaskell did not visit Haworth until after Emily's death, and admits to disliking what she knew of Emily.

=== Independence and strength of will ===
Emily is often described as strong-willed and independent: Constantin Heger speaks of her 'powerful reason' and 'strong, imperious will'. Winifred Gerin's biography describes her as a physically intrepid woman who carried a gun and who once, when bitten by a dog, cauterized the wound herself with a hot iron, to avoid worrying her sisters. (This story has been called into question by some biographers and scholars.) In Queens of Literature of the Victorian Era (1886), Eva Hope summarises Emily's character as: 'a peculiar mixture of timidity and Spartan-like courage'. According to Norma Crandall, her "warm, human aspect" was "usually revealed only in her love of nature and of animals". The Literary News (1883) states: "[Emily] loved the solemn moors, she loved all wild, free creatures and things".

=== Autism and anorexia ===
Emily's solitary and introverted nature has caused speculation regarding her neurology. Juliet Barker writes in her biography of the Brontës, that: "Emily ... was so absorbed in herself and her literary creations that she had little time for the genuine suffering of her family". The biographer Claire Harman has speculated that Emily's adherence to routine, along with her anger management issues, her aversion to social situations and her attachment to her home may all indicate that she had a form of autism. Although she seemingly enjoyed cooking and helping in the kitchen, John Sutherland mentions her 'obstinate fasting', and the biographer Katherine Frank suggests that Emily may have suffered from anorexia.

== Death ==
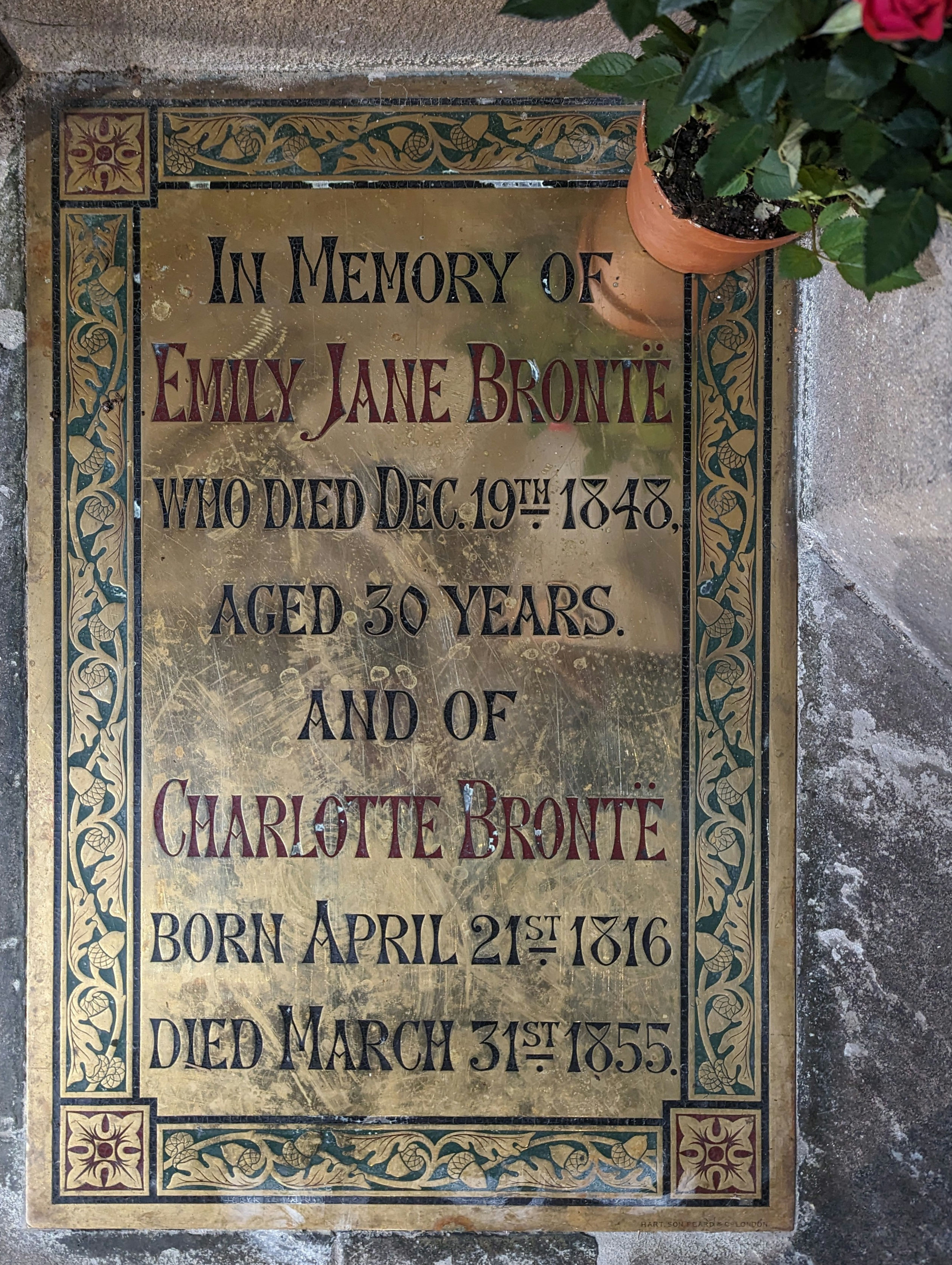
Brass plaque on family vault of Emily Brontë and Charlotte Brontë at St Michael and All Angels' Church, Haworth

Emily's brother Branwell died, probably of tuberculosis, on Sunday, 24 September 1848, following a long descent into alcoholism and drug addiction. At his funeral, a week later, Emily caught a severe cold that quickly developed into an inflammation of the lungs and may have accelerated an existing condition such as tuberculosis. It has been suggested that Emily's health had been weakened by insanitary conditions at home, where water was contaminated by runoff from the church's graveyard. Though her condition worsened steadily, Emily rejected medical help, saying that she would have "no poisoning doctor" near her. On the morning of 19 December 1848, Charlotte, fearing for her sister, wrote:

She grows daily weaker. The physician's opinion was expressed too obscurely to be of use – he sent some medicine which she would not take. Moments so dark as these I have never known – I pray for God's support to us all.

At noon, Emily's condition had worsened. With her last audible words, she said to Charlotte, "If you will send for a doctor, I will see him now", but it was too late. She died that same day at about two in the afternoon. According to Mary Robinson, an early biographer, Emily died on the sofa in the living room at the Parsonage, which she had adopted as a bed. A letter from Charlotte to William Smith Williams describes Emily's dog, Keeper, lying by her deathbed. Emily died less than three months after Branwell's death, which led Martha Brown, a housemaid, to declare that "Miss Emily died of a broken heart for love of her brother". Emily had grown so thin that her coffin measured only 16 inches (40 centimetres) wide. The carpenter said he had never made a narrower one for an adult. Her remains were interred in the family vault in St Michael and All Angels' Church, Haworth. A memorial to Emily and her sisters was installed in Poets' Corner in Westminster Abbey in 1939. The memorial omitted the diacritic in the family name, an omission that was corrected in 2024.

== Legacy ==
=== Literary impact ===
Although Emily's work was not widely appreciated at the time of its publication, Wuthering Heights has subsequently become an English literary classic, and is described in John Sutherland's Longman Companion to Victorian Fiction as the "twentieth century's favourite nineteenth-century novel". In 2007 it topped a Guardian poll of the nation's favourite love stories. Emily's poems, too, have reached a global audience. The opening line of "No coward soul is mine" is popular on mugs and key rings, and even as a tattoo.

Authors who have been inspired by Emily Brontë include: Anne Rice, Sylvia Plath, Jacqueline Wilson, Joanne Harris, Margaret Atwood, Kate Mosse, Dorothy Koomson and Lucy Powrie (who is now the chair of the Brontë Society). In 2018, to celebrate Emily Brontë's bicentenary year, The Borough Press published a collection of short stories entitled I Am Heathcliff, edited by Kate Mosse, and featuring stories by Leila Aboulela, Hanan Al-Shaykh, Joanna Cannon, Alison Case, Juno Dawson, Louise Doughty, Sophie Hannah, Anna James, Erin Kelly, Dorothy Koomson, Grace McCleen, Lisa McInerney, Laurie Penny, Nikesh Shukla, Michael Stewart and Louisa Young.

=== Adaptations ===
Wuthering Heights has been adapted many times, both in the UK and elsewhere, for radio, film, stage and television. The earliest adaptation of the novel was a silent film in 1920, directed by A. V. Bramble. Actors who have portrayed Catherine Earnshaw include Merle Oberon, Anna Calder-Marshall, Juliette Binoche, Rosemary Harris, and Charlotte Riley, and actors who have played Heathcliff include Sir Laurence Olivier, Timothy Dalton, Ralph Fiennes, and Tom Hardy. In 2025, Emma Rice premiered a stage musical adaptation of Wuthering Heights in Sydney, starring John Leader as Heathcliff. Emerald Fennell's film adaptation of Wuthering Heights, starring Margot Robbie and Jacob Elordi, premiered in 2026.

=== Biographical depictions ===
Numerous adaptations also exist depicting the sisters and their lives. The 1946 film Devotion was a highly fictionalized account of the lives of the Brontë sisters. In the 1973 Yorkshire Television series The Brontës of Haworth, written by Christopher Fry, Emily is played by Rosemary McHale. In the 2019 film How to Build a Girl, Emily and Charlotte Brontë are among the historical figures in Johanna's wall collage. In the 2022 film Emily, written and directed by Frances O'Connor, Emma Mackey plays the role of Emily Brontë before the publication of Wuthering Heights. The film mixes known biographical details with imagined situations and relationships.

In 2017, Catherynne Valente wrote The Glass Town Game, which reimagines the Brontë siblings as characters in their own version of C. S. Lewis' Narnia books. In 2020, graphic novelist Isabel Greenberg adapted Glass Town into a graphic novel that combines the Brontës' early fiction with memoir.

=== Music ===
A 1967 BBC adaptation of Emily's novel was the original inspiration for the debut single, "Wuthering Heights", by the UK singer-songwriter Kate Bush, released in January 1978. In 1996, the singer-songwriter Cliff Richard brought out Heathcliff, a stage musical based on the character, in which he himself played the lead. In 2019 the English folk group The Unthanks released Lines, three short albums, which include settings of Brontë's poems to music. Recording took place at the Brontës' home, using their own Regency era piano played by Adrian McNally. Norwegian composer Ola Gjeilo set selected Emily Brontë poems to music with SATB chorus, string orchestra, and piano, a work commissioned and premiered by the San Francisco Choral Society in a series of concerts in Oakland and San Francisco. In the 1940s the composer Bernard Herrmann wrote an opera based on Wuthering Heights.

== Works ==
- Bell, Currer; Bell, Ellis; Bell, Acton (1846). Poems.
- Bell, Ellis (1847). Wuthering Heights, a Novel (1 ed.). London: Thomas Cautley Newby. "Emily Brontë as 'Ellis Bell'"
- Gezari, Janet, ed. (1992). Emily Jane Brontë: the Complete Poems. Penguin Classics. New York: Penguin Books. ISBN 0140423524.
