= Gondal (fictional country) =

Fictional country described by Emily and Anne Brontë

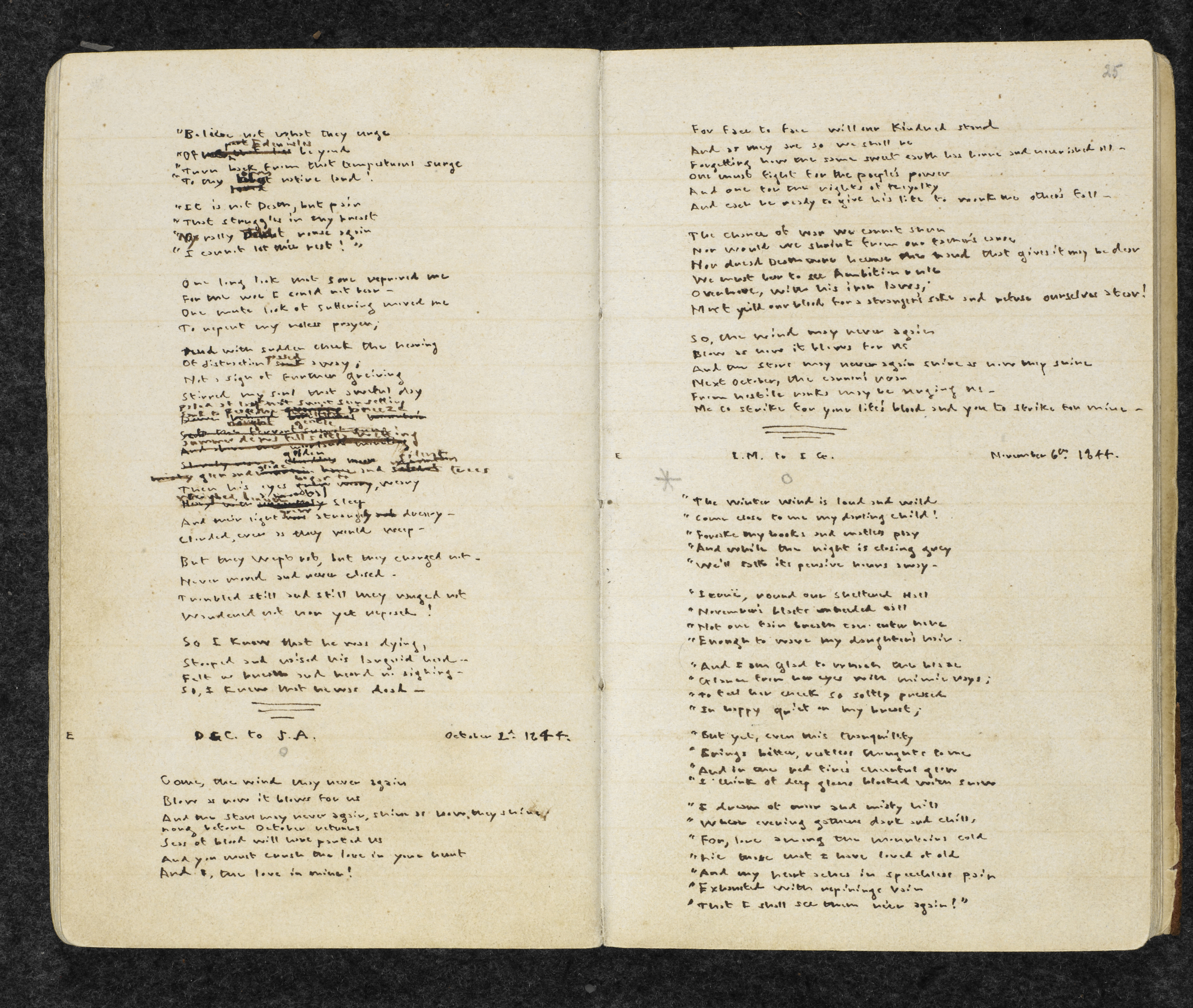
The manuscript of Emily Brontë's Gondal Poems

Gondal is an imaginary world or paracosm created by Emily Brontë and Anne Brontë that is found in their juvenilia. Gondal is an island in the North Pacific, just north of the island Gaaldine. It included at least four kingdoms: Gondal, Angora, Exina and Alcona. The earliest surviving reference comes from a diary entry in 1834. None of the prose fiction now survives but poetry still exists, mostly in the form of a manuscript donated to the British Museum in 1933; as do diary entries and scraps of lists. The poems are characterised by war, romance and intrigue. The Gondal setting, along with the similar Angria setting created by the other Brontë siblings, has been described as an early form of speculative fiction.

== Invention ==
The world of Gondal was invented as a joint venture by sisters Emily and Anne. It was a game which they may possibly have played to the end of their lives. Early on they had played with their older siblings Charlotte and Branwell in the imaginary country and game of Angria, which featured the Duke of Wellington and his sons as the heroes.

As in the case of Angria, Gondal has its origins in the Glasstown Confederacy, an earlier imaginary setting created by the siblings as children. Glasstown was founded when twelve wooden soldiers were offered to Branwell Brontë by his father, Patrick Brontë, on 5 June 1826. The soldiers became characters in their imaginary world. Charlotte wrote:

Branwell came to our door with a box of soldiers Emily & I jumped out of bed and I snat[c]hed up one & exclaimed this is the Duke of Wellington it shall be mine!! [Wellington was the current Prime Minister of the United Kingdom, and he had defeated the French leader Napoléon Bonaparte at the famous Battle of Waterloo.] When I said this Emily likewise took one & said it should be hers when Anne came down she took one also. Mine was the prettiest of the whole & perfect in every part Emilys was a Grave looking fellow we called him Gravey. Anne's was a queer little thing very much like herself. [H]e was called Waiting Boy[.] Branwell chose Bonaparte.

— Charlotte Brontë, The History of the Year

However, it was only during December 1827 that the world really took shape, when Charlotte suggested that everyone own and manage their own island, which they named after heroic leaders: Charlotte had Wellington, Branwell had Sneaky, Emily had Parry, and Anne had Ross. Each island's capital was called Glasstown, hence the name of the Glasstown Confederacy.

Emily and Anne, as the youngest siblings, were often relegated to inferior positions within the game. Therefore, they staged a rebellion and established the imaginary world of Gondal for themselves. "The Gondal Chronicles", which would have given us the full story of Gondal, has unfortunately been lost, but the poems and the diary entries they wrote to each other provide something of an outline. The earliest documented reference to Gondal is one of Emily's diary entries in 1834, 9 years after the Glasstown Confederacy, when the two younger sisters were aged 16 and 14 respectively; it read: "The Gondals are discovering the interior of Gaaldine."

All of the prose chronicles are now lost. The only surviving remnants of the Gondal works are made up of poems, diary entries and some occasional memory aids such as lists of names and characteristics.

== World and characters ==
The Gondal saga is set on two islands in the North and South Pacific. The northern island, Gondal, is a realm of moorlands and snow (based on Yorkshire). The southern island, Gaaldine, features a more tropical climate. Gaaldine is subject to Gondal, which may be related to the period in which the stories were written, the early nineteenth century, when Britain was expanding its empire. It is believed that the stories about them, all now lost, were filled with melodrama and intrigue, and that Anne Brontë used characters that her sister Emily did not. The early part of Gondal's history followed the life of the warlike Julius Brenzaida, a figure reminiscent of the Duke of Zamorna from the siblings' earlier Tales of Angria, and the Prince of Gondal's primary kingdom of Angora. The two loves of Brenzaida's life were Rosina, who became his wife and queen, and Geraldine Sidonia, who gave birth to his daughter, Augusta Geraldin Almeda (A.G.A). Julius was evidently two-faced: after sharing a coronation with Gerald, King of Exina, he had him imprisoned and executed. Julius was eventually assassinated during a civil war and was succeeded by his daughter, A.G.A., who was similar to her father in temperament. She had several lovers, including Alexander of Elbë, Fernando De Samara, and Alfred Sidonia of Aspin Castle, all of whom died. She was eventually murdered during a civil war.

== Interpretation ==
Several of Emily's poems that had been assumed to be allegories for personal experiences were eventually revealed to be episodes in the Gondal saga.

The poems were very personal to Emily: when Charlotte once discovered them, by accident, Emily was furious. Like Byron, Emily saw poetry as more of a process than a product.

In most cases, Emily destroyed her notes after transcribing the poems into fair-copy manuscript, and where draft versions survive they show only minor differences. The only draft with major differences that survives is of the Gondal poem "Why ask to know the date—the clime".

The first attempt to reconstruct the Gondal material was made by Fanny Ratchford, in a study published by 1945. She has been accused of confusing the issue by assuming that three characters were intended to be the same individual: Rosina, AGA and Geraldine Sidonia. The settings were described in detail by Laura Hinkley in The Brontës (1945), which was used as a source for Philip Henderson's introduction to The Complete Poems of Emily Brontë (1951), a Folio Society publication. William Doremus Paden, in An Investigation of Gondal (1958), created a detailed chronology of Gondal.

The writings about Angria and Gondal have been seen as early forms of both science fiction and fan fiction. According to Andy Sawyer, Director of the Science Fiction Studies MA at the University of Liverpool, "The Brontës are well known authors with no apparent association with science fiction, but their tiny manuscript books, held at the British Library, are one of the first examples of fan fiction, using favourite characters and settings in the same way as science fiction and fantasy fans now play in the detailed imaginary 'universes' of Star Trek or Harry Potter. While the sense of fantasy is strong, there are teasing examples of what might be called the beginnings of science fiction." Specifically, these works would be "RPF" or real person fiction.

== Poems ==
In February 1844, Emily Brontë copied her poems into two notebooks, one containing Gondal poetry and one containing non-Gondal poetry. The non-Gondal notebook was discovered in 1926 by Mr. Davidson Cook and reproduced in the Shakespeare Head edition of Emily's poems. The notebook of Gondal poems was presented to the British Museum in 1933 by the descendants of Mr. George Smith, of Smith, Elder & Co., Charlotte Brontë's publisher. It was published in full in 1938.

Gondal Poems As listed in the 1938 edition published by Helen Brown and Joan Mott, based on Emily's original manuscript
#	Fictional correspondent(s)	Title	First line	Date	Notes
1	A.G.A.		"There shines the moon, at noon of night"	6 March 1837	
2	A.G.A. to A.E.		"Lord of Elbë, on Elbë Hill"	19 August 1837	
3	A.G.A. to A.S.		"At such a time, in such a spot"	6 May 1840 (alt. 28 July 1843)	
4	To A.G.A.		"'Thou standest in the green-wood now'"		
5	A.G.A. to A.S.		"This summer wind, with thee and me"	2 March 1844	
6	A.G.A. to A.S.		"O wander not so far away!"	20 May 1838	
7	A.G.A.		"To the bluebell"	9 May 1839	
8		Written in Aspin Castle	"How do I love on summer nights"	20 August 1842 (alt. 6 February 1843)	
9		Douglas's Ride	"Well, narrower draw the circle round"	11 July 1838	
10	By R. Gleneden		"From our evening fireside now"	17 April 1839	
11		Gleneden's Dream	"Tell me, watcher, is it winter?"	21 May 1838	
12		Rosina	"Weeks of wildest delirium past"	1 September 1841	
13	Songs by Julius Brenzaida to G.S.		"Geraldine, the moon is shining"	17 October 1838	
14	Songs by J. Brenzaida to G.S.		"I knew not twas so dire a crime"	17 October 1838	Prior to the discover of the manuscript with the complete set of poems, this was considered to be a personal love poem.
15		Geraldine	"'Twas night, her comrades gathered all"	17 August 1841	
16	A.G.A.		"For him who struck thy foreign string"	30 August 1838	
17	F. de Samara, written in the Gaaldine prison caves to A.G.A.		"Thy sun is near meridian height"	6 January 1840	
18	F. de Samara to A.G.A.		"Light up thy halls! 'tis closing day"	1 November 1838	This poem was also once considered personal.
19	Written in returning to the P. of I. on 10 January 1827		"The busy day has hurried by"	14 June 1839	
20		On the fall of Zalona	"All blue and bright, in glorious light"	24 February 1843	
21	A.G.A.	The Death of	"Were they shepherds, who sat all day"	January 1841 (alt. May 1844)	
22		A Farewell to Alexandria	"I've seen this dell in July's shine"	12 July 1839	
23	E.W. to A.G.A.		"How few, of all the hearts that loved"	11 March 1844	
24			"Come, walk with me"		
25	Date 18, E.G. to M.R.		"thy Guardians are asleep"	4 May 1843	
26	To A.S. 1830		"Where beams the sun the brightest"	1 May 1843	
27			"In the earth, the earth though shalt be laid"	6 September 1843	
28	A.S. to G.S.		"I do not weep, I would not weep"	19 December 1841	
29	M.G. For the US		"'Twas yesterday at early dawn"	19 December 1843	
30			"'The linnet in the rocky dells'" [signed E.W.]	1 May 1844	
31	J.B., 11 November 1844	From the Dungeon Wall in the Southern College – J.B. Sept 1825	"'Listen! when your hair like mine'"		
32	Dec., 2nd, 1844. From a D.W. in the N.C. A.G.A. Sept 1826		"'Oh Day, He cannot die'"		
33	D.G.C. to J.A.		"Come, the wind may never again"	2 October 1844	
34	I.M. to I.G.		"'The winter wind is loud and wild"	6 November 1844	
35	M. Douglas to E.R. Gleneden		"The moon is full this winter night"	21 November 1844	
36	R. Alcona to J. Brenzaida		"Cold in the earth and the deep snow piled above thee!"	3 March 1845	
37	H.A. and A.S.		"In the same place, when Nature wore"	17 May 1842	
38	Rodric Lesley. 1830.		"Lie down and rest – the fight is done"	18 December 1843	
39			"A thousand sounds of happiness"	22 April 1845	
40	A.E. and R.C.		"Heavy hangs the raindrop"	28 May 1845	
41	M.A. written on the Dungeon Wall – N.C.		"I know that tonight, the wind is sighing" [signed M.A.]	August 1845	
42	Julian M. and A.G. Rochelle		"Silent is the House – all are laid to sleep"	9 October 1845	
43			"Why ask to know the date – the clime?"	14 September 1846	This poem (and the alternative version poem 44) were written after Wuthering Heights and are the only surviving writings from the last 2½ years of Emily's life.
44			"Why ask to know what date, what clime?"	13 May 1847 [or 1848?]	A different version of poem 43
Source: Brontë, Emily Jane (1938). "Contents of Manuscript". In Brown, Helen; Mott, Joan (eds.). Gondal Poems. Oxford: The Shakespeare Head Press. pp. 35–47.
