= Anne Brontë =

English novelist and poet (1820–1849)

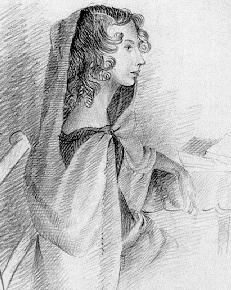
- A sketch of Anne by her sister Charlotte, c. 1845
- Born: 17 January 1820; Thornton, West Riding of Yorkshire, England
- Died: 28 May 1849 (aged 29); Scarborough, North Riding of Yorkshire, England
- Resting place: St. Mary's Churchyard, Scarborough
- Occupations: Poet, novelist, governess
- Parent(s): Patrick Brontë; Maria Branwell
- Relatives: Brontë family
- Writing career
- Pen name: Acton Bell
- Language: English
- Period: 1836–1849
- Genres: Fiction, poetry
- Notable work: The Tenant of Wildfell Hall Agnes Grey
- Movement: Realism
- Works related to Anne Brontë at Wikisource

Anne Brontë (/ˈbrɒnti/, commonly /-teɪ/; 17 January 1820 – 28 May 1849) was an English novelist and poet. A member of the Brontë literary family, she was the younger sister of Charlotte, Emily, and Branwell. Anne is known for her 1847 novel Agnes Grey and for her 1848 novel The Tenant of Wildfell Hall, which is considered to be one of the first feminist novels.

Anne was the last of six children born to Patrick Brontë, an Irish clergyman, and Maria Brontë (née Branwell), the daughter of a Cornish merchant. Her mother died when Anne was one year old, and her two eldest sisters, Maria and Elizabeth, died when she was four. She lived most of her life with her father and three surviving siblings in Haworth, Yorkshire, where her father served as perpetual curate, leaving to attend boarding school in Mirfield between 1836 and 1837 and to work as a governess for a number of families between 1839 and 1845. In 1846, she and her sisters, Charlotte and Emily, published a book of poetry, writing under the pseudonyms Acton, Currer, and Ellis Bell. Anne's first novel, Agnes Grey, was published as one of a three-volume set which also included Wuthering Heights by her sister Emily. The Tenant of Wildfell Hall was published a year later.

Anne died aged 29, most likely of pulmonary tuberculosis. After her death, her sister Charlotte wrote a preface and explanatory notice to the new edition of Agnes Grey, but prevented republication of The Tenant of Wildfell Hall, believing it to be "a mistake." This decision harmed Anne's popularity as a writer. Nonetheless, both of her novels are now considered classics of English literature.

== Family background ==
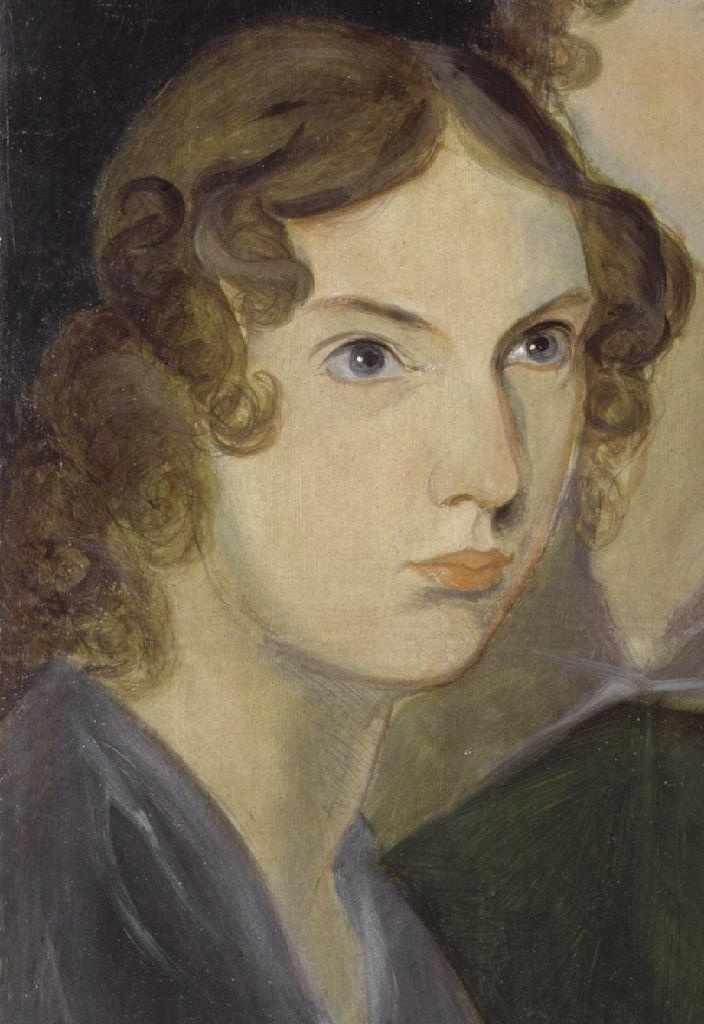
Anne, from a group portrait by her brother Branwell

Anne's father was Patrick Brontë, the oldest of ten children born to Hugh Brunty and Eleanor McCrory, who were poor Irish peasant farmers. Patrick, an ambitious young man, attended St John's College, Cambridge, and took orders within the Church of England. Anne's mother was Maria Branwell, the daughter of Anne Carne and Thomas Branwell, a successful and property-owning grocer and tea merchant in Penzance.

Patrick and Maria were married in 1812 in Guiseley, in Yorkshire, and went to live in nearby Hartshead, where Patrick had been appointed incumbent. Their first child, Maria (1814–1825), was born there in 1814. In 1815, Patrick was appointed curate of the chapel in Market Street Thornton, near Bradford. A second daughter, Elizabeth (1815–1825), was born shortly after. Four more children followed: Charlotte (1816–1855), Patrick Branwell (1817–1848), Emily (1818–1848), and Anne (1820–1849).

== Early life ==
Anne was born on 17 January 1820 at the parsonage in Market Street, Thornton, on the outskirts of Bradford, where her father, Patrick, was curate. She was baptised in Thornton on 25 March 1820, and soon after, Patrick was appointed to the perpetual curacy in Haworth, seven miles (11 km) away. In April 1820, the family moved into the five-roomed Haworth Parsonage.

When Anne was barely a year old, her mother, Maria, fell ill, and died on 15 September 1821, of what may have been uterine cancer. Patrick tried to remarry, without success. Maria's sister, Elizabeth Branwell, had moved to the parsonage initially to care for Maria, but stayed on to help with the children, and remained there until her death. She was stern and expected respect, not love. There was little affection between her and the older children, although according to Ellen Nussey, a family friend, Anne was her aunt's favourite. Like her siblings, Anne was precocious: in Elizabeth Gaskell's biography of Charlotte, Patrick remembered that when Anne was four years old he had asked her what a child most wanted and she had replied: "age and experience".

Midway through 1824 Patrick sent Maria, Elizabeth, Charlotte, and Emily to school at Crofton Hall in Crofton, West Yorkshire, and subsequently to the Clergy Daughter's School at Cowan Bridge in Lancashire. Conditions at Cowan Bridge were harsh, with poor food and frequent outbreaks of disease, all of which may have contributed to the deaths of Maria and Elizabeth Brontë. Maria and Elizabeth had been sent home from school ill following an outbreak of typhus, and they died soon afterwards, probably of tuberculosis. The deaths of the two eldest girls distressed the family so much that Patrick could not face sending his surviving daughters away again. Charlotte and Emily were removed from Cowan Bridge, and they and their siblings were educated at home for the next five years, largely by their aunt Elizabeth and by Patrick himself.

The children made little attempt to mix with others outside the parsonage and relied on each other for company. The moors surrounding Haworth became their playground. Anne shared a room with her aunt, which may have influenced Anne's personality and religious beliefs. Anne was very close to all her siblings, but remained closest to Emily; Ellen Nussey described them as being "like twins."

== Education ==
Anne's studies at home included music and drawing. The Keighley church organist gave piano lessons to Anne, Emily, and Branwell, and John Bradley of Keighley gave them art lessons. Their aunt tried to teach the girls how to run a household, but they inclined more to the study of literature, and read widely from their father's well-stocked library. Their reading included the Bible, Homer, Virgil, Shakespeare, Milton, Byron, Scott, articles from Blackwood's Edinburgh Magazine and Fraser's Magazine and The Edinburgh Review, as well as books of history, geography and biography.

In June 1826, their father gave Branwell a set of toy soldiers, which he shared with his sisters. The siblings gave names to the soldiers, also known as "The Young Men" or the "Twelves", and developed their characters. This led to the creation of an imaginary kingdom: Angria, a series of fictional islands off the coast of West Africa, which they illustrated with maps and watercolour renderings. The children played games and wrote stories, poems and plays about the inhabitants of Angria and its capital city, "Glass Town", also referred to as Verreopolis or Verdopolis. These stories, which sometimes included details taken from real-world sources, often took the shape of tiny books, hand-stitched and made from pieces of scrap paper.

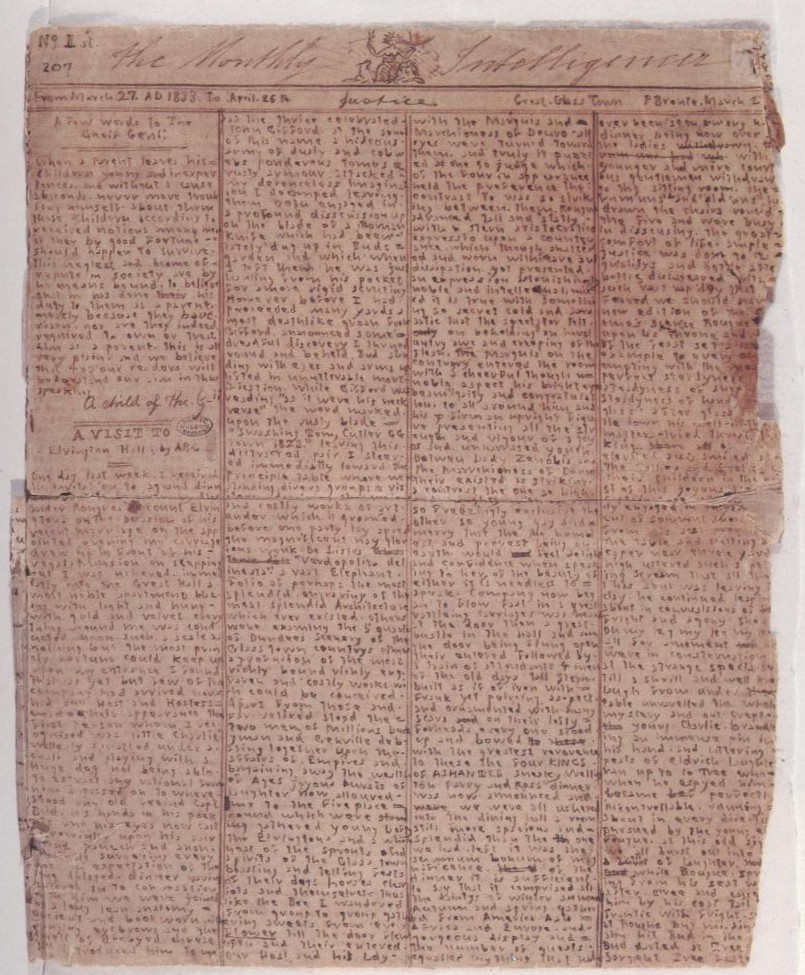
First page of one of the "little books" produced by the siblings.

== Juvenilia ==
Around 1831, when Anne was eleven, she and Emily broke away from the Angrian world, which had become dominated by Charlotte and Branwell, to create and develop their own fantasy world, Gondal, which would continue to influence them into adulthood. Anne and Emily had always been particularly close, and this close relationship continued after Charlotte left for Roe Head School in January 1831. Charlotte's school friend Ellen Nussey, visiting Haworth in 1833, reported that Emily and Anne were "inseparable companions". She described Anne thus:

Anne, dear gentle Anne was quite different in appearance from the others, and she was her aunt's favourite. Her hair was a very pretty light brown and fell on her neck in graceful curls. She had lovely violet-blue eyes; fine pencilled eyebrows and a clear almost transparent complexion.

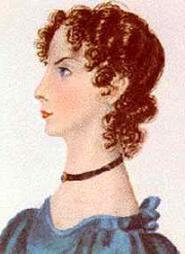
Anne Brontë, by Charlotte Brontë, 1834

In 1832, Charlotte finished her schooling at Roe Head, returning to the parsonage to tutor her siblings. She then returned to Roe Head as a teacher in July 1835, accompanied by Emily, who was a pupil. Emily's tuition was largely financed by Charlotte's teaching. However, Emily was unable to adapt to life at school and suffered from severe homesickness. She was withdrawn from the school in October, and Anne took her place there.

At this point, Anne was fifteen. It was her first time away from home, and she remained at Roe Head for two years, returning home only during the Christmas and summer holidays. She made few friends at Roe Head, and made little impression on her teachers, although she did win a good-conduct prize in 1836. She was quiet, hardworking, and although she missed the parsonage, she was determined to stay to acquire the education that she would need to support herself.

In December 1837, Anne fell seriously ill with gastritis. A Moravian minister was called to see her several times during her illness, suggesting that her distress was caused, in part, by a crisis of faith triggered by the staunch Calvinism of the school. Concerned for her sister's health, Charlotte wrote to their father, and he arranged for Anne to be sent home.

== Employment at Blake Hall ==
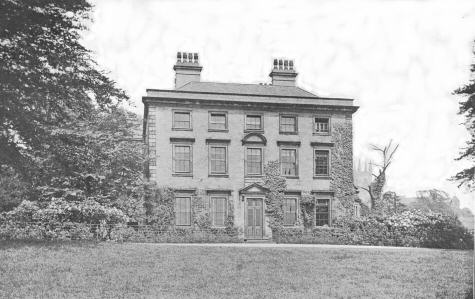
Blake Hall, illustration, reproduced from photographs taken at the end of 19th century. It was demolished in 1954.

On leaving Roe Head, Anne sought employment as a governess, one of the few options available to a woman of her background. In April 1839, Anne, now aged nineteen, took up a post with the Ingham family at Blake Hall, near Mirfield.

The Inghams were wealthy, with five young children, the eldest of whom was six years old. In a letter to Charlotte, Anne describes the children as "little dunces" and "excessively indulged." Anne had great difficulty controlling them and little success in educating them. She was not allowed to punish them, and when she complained about their behaviour, she received no support and was criticised for being incapable. The Inghams were dissatisfied with their children's progress, and after nine months, Anne was dismissed. She returned home in December 1839 to join Charlotte and Emily, who had also left their positions. Anne's unhappy time at Blake Hall is believed to have been the principal inspiration for her novel Agnes Grey.

== William Weightman ==
When Anne returned to Haworth, she formed a friendship with William Weightman, her father's new curate, who had started work in the parish in August 1839. Weightman was 25 and had obtained a two-year licentiate in theology from the University of Durham. He was handsome, popular with the family, and became a frequent visitor to the parsonage until his sudden death from cholera in 1842. He had an outgoing and flirtatious personality, and, on learning that none of the Brontë sisters had ever received a Valentine's card, wrote cards and poems to all three of them, as well as to Ellen Nussey, who was staying with them at the time. It has been suggested that Anne may have been in love with him, although there is little real evidence to confirm this, aside from a poem written by Anne after his death, I will not mourn thee, lovely one, which seems to express the affection that the whole family felt for the young curate.

== Thorp Green ==
From 1840 to 1845, Anne worked at Thorp Green Hall, a comfortable country house near York. Here she worked as a governess to the children of the Reverend Edmund Robinson and his wife, Lydia. The house appears as Horton Lodge in Agnes Grey. It was at the Long Plantation at Thorp Green in 1842 that Anne wrote her three-verse poem Lines Composed in a Wood on a Windy Day, which was published in 1846 under the name Acton Bell.

The Robinsons had five children: Lydia (15), Elizabeth (13), Mary (12), Edmund (8), and a baby, Georgina, aged eighteen months, who died the year Anne arrived. She initially had problems similar to those she had encountered at Blake Hall: she missed her home and family, and her quiet and gentle disposition made it a challenge for her to settle into the household. In a diary paper in 1841, Anne wrote that she did not like her situation and wished to leave it; but she was determined to make a success of her position, and became well-liked by her employers. Her charges, the Robinson girls, became lifelong friends.

Anne spent only five or six weeks a year with her own family, during holidays at Christmas and in June. The rest of her time was spent with the Robinsons. She accompanied the family on annual holidays to Scarborough, a place which became very dear to her. Between 1840 and 1844, Anne spent each summer at the coastal town, several locations of which feature in her novels. She had opportunities to collect semi-precious stones, developing an interest in geology, depicting it in her novels as an interest equally suitable for men and women.

Anne and her sisters considered setting up a school while she was still working for the Robinsons. Various locations were considered, including the parsonage, but because of a lack of suitable pupils, the project never materialised. In early November 1842, Anne came home following the death of her aunt while her sisters were in Brussels. Elizabeth Branwell left a legacy of just under £300 for each of her nieces.

In January 1843, Anne returned to Thorp Green and secured a position for Branwell as tutor to Edmund, who was growing too old to be in Anne's care. Branwell did not live in the house as Anne did, and his tutorship was unsuccessful. He was eventually sent home in disgrace after developing an infatuation with Mrs Robinson, the mother of his charge. Anne's writings reflect her inner turmoil and her efforts to remain calm at this time. All three Brontë sisters worked as governesses or teachers, and all experienced problems controlling their charges, gaining support from their employers, and coping with homesickness, but Anne was the only one who persevered and made a success of her work.

== Back at the parsonage ==
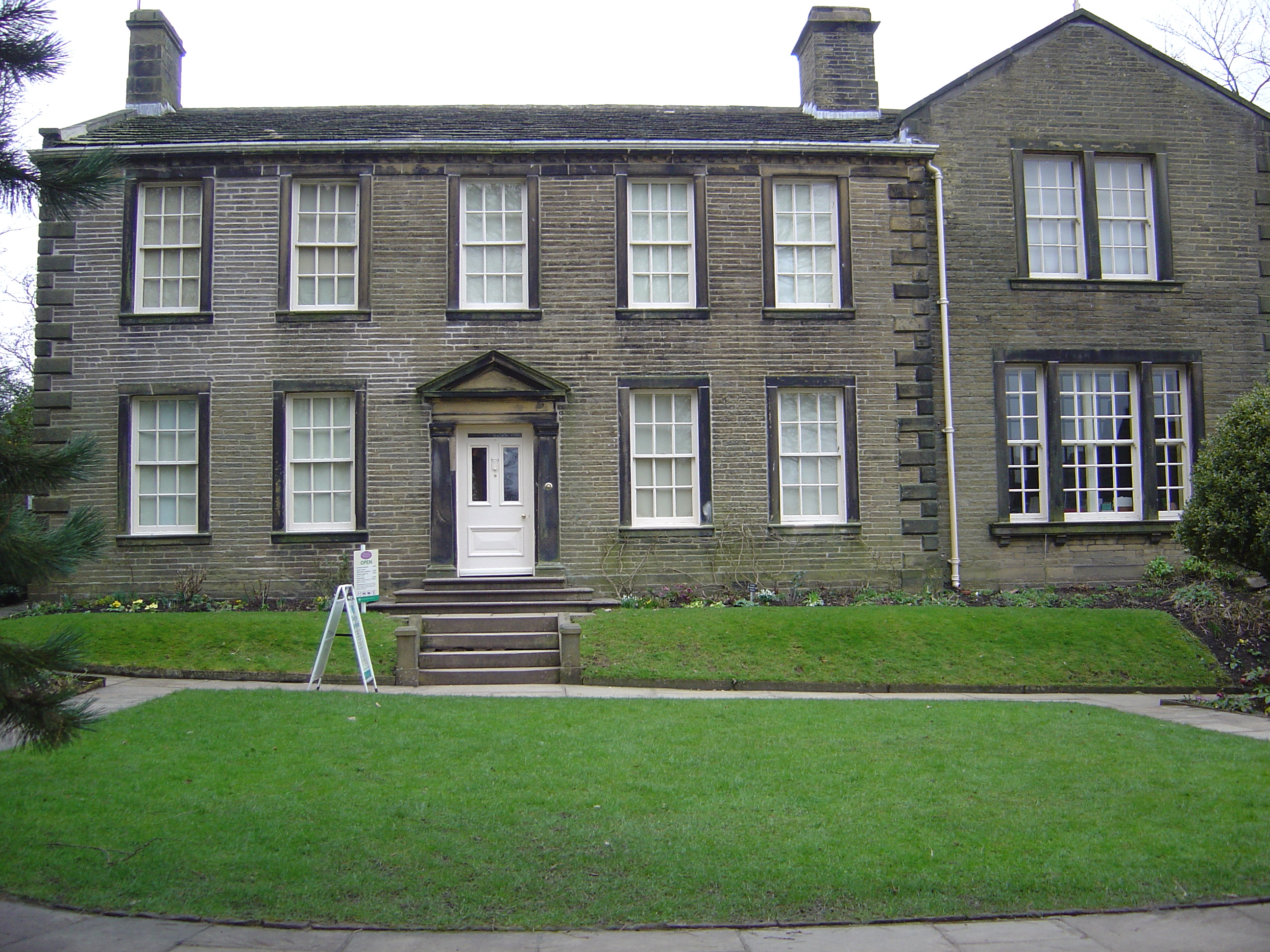
Brontë Parsonage Museum

When Anne and Branwell returned home for the holidays in June 1845, Anne resigned from her post at Thorp Green. Anne gave no reason for her resignation, but it may have been provoked by the relationship between her brother and Mrs Robinson. Branwell left soon afterwards. Anne continued to exchange letters with Elizabeth and Mary Robinson.

== A book of poems ==
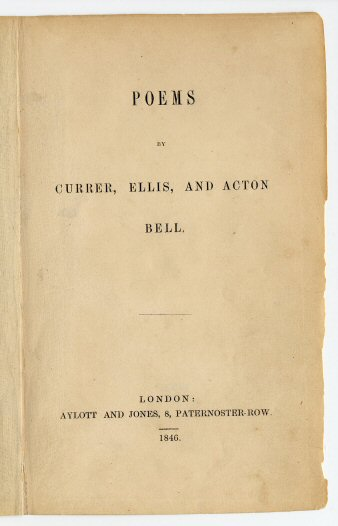
Poems by Currer, Ellis and Acton Bell. First edition

In 1845, the Brontës were at home with their father. None of the siblings had any immediate prospect of employment. Charlotte found Emily's poems, which had been shared only with Anne, and insisted that they should be published. Emily was angry at the invasion of her privacy, and refused to contemplate publication, but Anne revealed that she too had been writing poems in secret, poems which Charlotte "thought ... had a sweet sincere pathos of their own". Encouraged by Charlotte, the sisters agreed to have the poems published. They told nobody what they were doing. With the money left by Elizabeth Branwell, they paid for the publication of a collection of poems, 21 from Anne, 21 from Emily, and 19 from Charlotte.

The book was published under pen names, which retained their initials but concealed their sex. Anne's pseudonym was Acton Bell; Charlotte's was Currer Bell, and Emily's, Ellis Bell. Poems by Currer, Ellis, and Acton Bell was published in May 1846. The cost of publication was 31 pounds and 10 shillings, about three-quarters of Anne's salary at Thorp Green. On 7 May 1846 the first three copies were delivered to Haworth Parsonage. The book achieved favourable reviews from The Critic and the Athenaeum, but was a commercial failure, with only two copies sold in the first year. Anne nonetheless found a market for her later poetry. The Leeds Intelligencer and Fraser's Magazine published her poem The Narrow Way under her pseudonym in December 1848. Four months earlier, Fraser's Magazine had published her poem The Three Guides.

== Novels ==
=== Agnes Grey ===
By July 1846, a package containing the manuscripts of each sister's first novel was making the rounds of London publishers. Charlotte had written The Professor, Emily had written Wuthering Heights, and Anne had written Agnes Grey. Agnes Grey, like Charlotte's second novel Jane Eyre, drew upon her experience as a governess.

After some rejections, Wuthering Heights and Agnes Grey were accepted by the publisher Thomas Cautley Newby. The Professor was not accepted, although it is not certain whether the novel was rejected outright, or whether Charlotte was unwilling to pay the fifty pounds required to finance its publication. However, Charlotte's second novel, Jane Eyre, was accepted immediately by Smith, Elder & Co. It was the first of the sisters' novels to be published, and it was a resounding success. Meanwhile, Anne and Emily's novels "lingered in the press". Anne and Emily were obliged to pay fifty pounds to help meet their publishing costs. Their publisher was galvanised by the success of Jane Eyre and published Wuthering Heights and Agnes Grey together in December 1847, although Agnes Grey was outshone by Emily's more dramatic Wuthering Heights.

=== The Tenant of Wildfell Hall ===
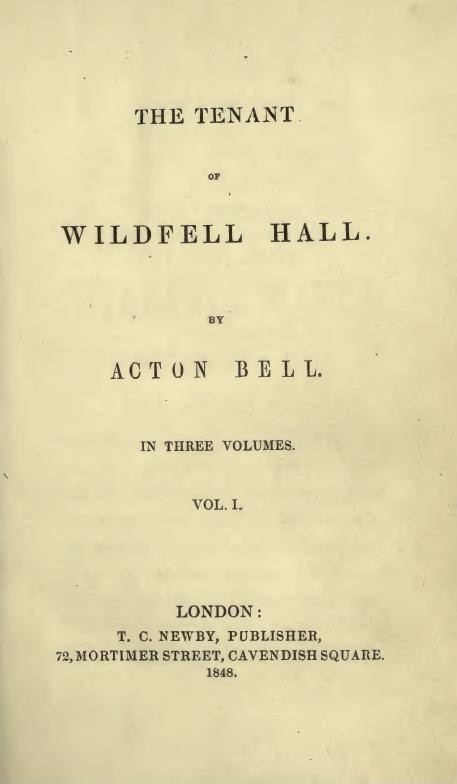
Title-page of the first edition, 1848

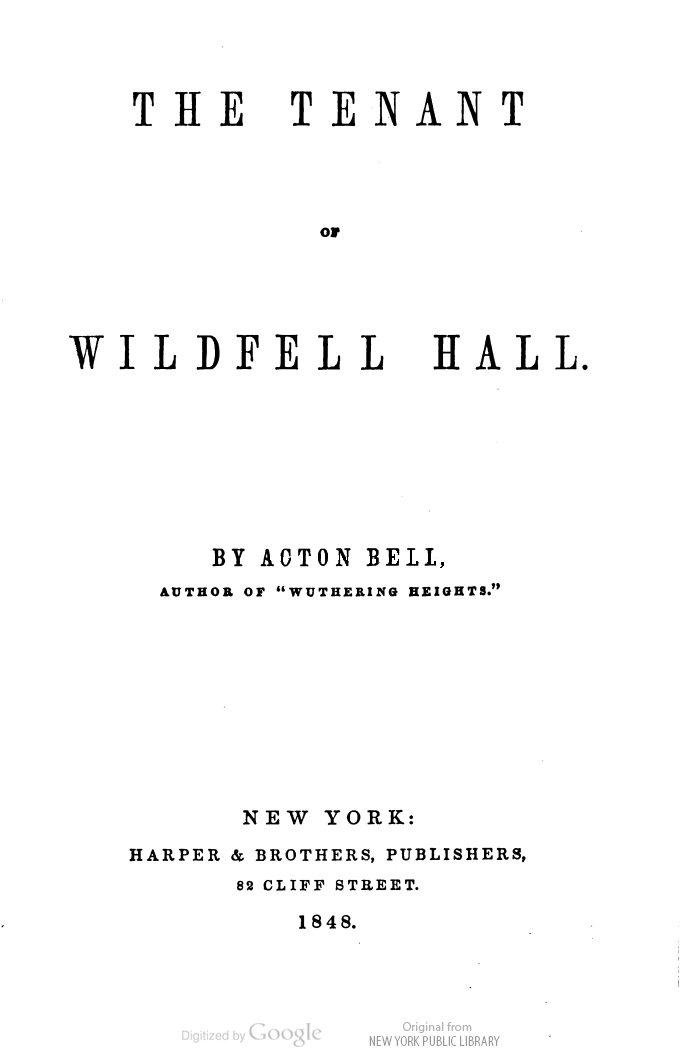
Title-page of the first American edition, 1848

"Sick of mankind and their disgusting ways," scribbled Anne Brontë in pencil at the back of her Prayer Book.

— Stevie Davies, Introduction in The Tenant of Wildfell Hall, Penguin Classics.

Anne's second novel, The Tenant of Wildfell Hall, was published in 1848. The first reviews came out on July 8, and although The Athenaeum published a complimentary review, the novel attracted the same criticisms of "coarseness" that had been levelled at the Bell brothers' previous work.

The novel challenged contemporary social and legal structures, dealing as it did with themes of social injustice and spousal abuse, and is now regarded by many as one of the first feminist novels.

In the book, Helen has left her abusive husband to protect their son from his influence. She lives in hiding, supporting herself and her son by painting. By doing this, she has violated social conventions and English law. Until the Married Women's Property Act 1870 was passed, a married woman had no legal existence independent from her husband, could not own property, nor sue for divorce nor control the custody of her children. By law, Helen's husband would have had a right to reclaim her and charge her with kidnapping. By subsisting on her own income, she was stealing her husband's property since this income was legally his. The fact that the author clearly invites sympathy, and not censure, for her heroine, incurred the disapproval of critics, although in 1913, May Sinclair said that the slamming of Helen Huntingdon's bedroom door against her husband reverberated throughout Victorian England.

Anne stated her intentions in the second edition, published in August 1848. She presented a forceful rebuttal to critics (among them Charlotte) who considered her portrayal of Huntingdon overly graphic and disturbing. Anne "wished to tell the truth". She explained: "When we have to do with vice and vicious characters, I maintain it is better to depict them as they really are than as they would wish to appear." Anne also castigated reviewers who speculated on the sex of authors and the perceived appropriateness of their writing. She was:

... satisfied that if a book is a good one, it is so whatever the sex of the author may be. All novels are or should be written for both men and women to read, and I am at a loss to conceive how a man should permit himself to write anything that would be really disgraceful to a woman, or why a woman should be censured for writing anything that would be proper and becoming for a man.

== London visit ==
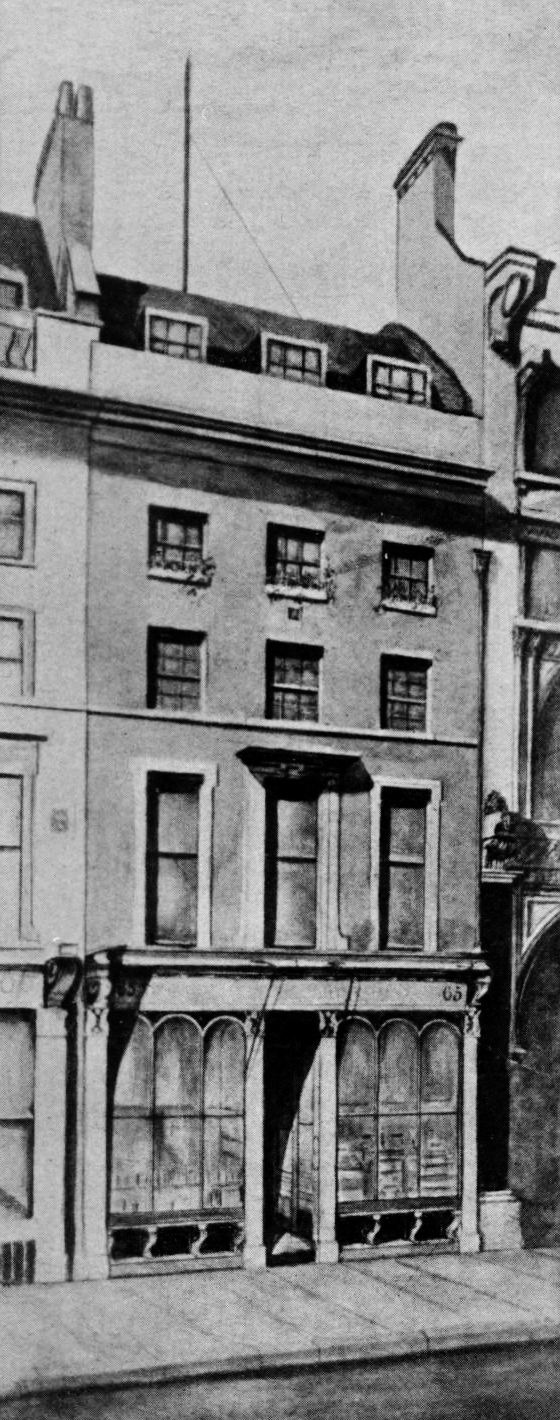
The offices of Smith, Elder & Co. at No. 65 Cornhill

In July 1848, Anne and Charlotte went to Charlotte's publisher George Smith in London to dispel the rumour that the "Bell brothers" were one person. Emily refused to go. Anne and Charlotte spent several days with Smith. Many years after Anne's death, he wrote in The Cornhill Magazine his impressions of her:

a gentle, quiet, rather subdued person, by no means pretty, yet of a pleasing appearance. Her manner was curiously expressive of a wish for protection and encouragement, a kind of constant appeal which invited sympathy.

The increasing popularity of the Bells' works led to renewed interest in Poems by Currer, Ellis, and Acton Bell, originally published by Aylott and Jones. The remaining print run was bought by Smith and Elder and reissued under new covers in November 1848. It still sold poorly.

== Family tragedies ==
Branwell's persistent drunkenness had disguised the decline of his health, and he died on 24 September 1848. His sudden death shocked the family. He was 31. The cause was recorded as chronic bronchitis, but was probably tuberculosis.

Soon after this in the same year Emily became very ill. She worsened over two months and died on 19 December, aged 30. Emily's death deeply affected Anne. Her grief undermined her physical health. Over Christmas, Anne had influenza. Her symptoms intensified, and in early January, her father sent for a Leeds physician. The doctor diagnosed advanced consumption with little hope of recovery. In her letter to Ellen Nussey Anne expressed her frustrated ambitions:

I have no horror of death: if I thought it inevitable I think I could quietly resign myself to the prospect ... But I wish it would please God to spare me not only for Papa's and Charlotte's sakes but because I long to do some good in the world before I leave it. I have many schemes in my head for future practise – humble and limited indeed – but still I should not like them all to come to nothing, and myself to have lived to so little purpose. But God's will be done.

Anne took all the recommended medicines and followed the advice she was given. She also wrote her last poem, A dreadful darkness closes in, in which she deals with being terminally ill. Her health fluctuated for months, but she grew thinner and weaker.

== Death ==
Anne Brontë's grave in Scarborough in 2026

Anne seemed somewhat better in February. She decided to visit Scarborough to see if the change of location and the fresh sea air might benefit her. Charlotte was initially against the journey, fearing that it would be too stressful, but changed her mind after the doctor's approval and Anne's assurance that it was her last hope.

On 24 May 1849 Anne set off for Scarborough with Charlotte and Ellen Nussey. They spent a day and night in York en route. Here they escorted Anne in a wheelchair, did some shopping and visited York Minster. It was clear that Anne had little strength left.

On Sunday 27 May Anne asked Charlotte whether it would be easier to return home to die instead of remaining in Scarborough. A doctor was consulted the next day and said that death was close. Anne received the news quietly. She expressed her love and concern for Ellen and Charlotte and whispered for Charlotte to "take courage". Anne died at about two o'clock in the afternoon on 28 May 1849, aged 29.

Charlotte decided to "lay the flower where it had fallen" and arranged for Anne to be buried in Scarborough. The funeral was held on 30 May. The former schoolmistress at Roe Head, Miss Wooler, was in Scarborough, and she and Ellen were the only other mourners at Anne's funeral. Anne was buried in St Mary's churchyard, beneath the castle walls and overlooking the south bay. Charlotte commissioned a stone to be placed over her grave with the inscription:

Here lie the remains of Anne Brontë, daughter of the Revd P. Brontë, Incumbent of Haworth, Yorkshire. She died Aged 28 May 28th 1849.

When Charlotte visited the grave three years later she discovered several errors on the headstone and had it refaced, but it was still not free of error, for Anne was 29 when she died, not 28 as written.

In 2011 the Brontë Society installed a new plaque at Anne Brontë's grave. The original gravestone had become illegible in places and could not be restored. It was left undisturbed while the new plaque was laid horizontally, interpreting the fading words of the original and correcting its errors. In April 2013 the Brontë Society held a dedication and blessing service at the graveside to mark the installation of the new plaque.

== Reputation ==
After Anne's death, Charlotte added a preface and explanatory notice to a new edition of Agnes Grey, hoping to address its earlier criticisms, but she prevented republication of The Tenant of Wildfell Hall. In 1850, Charlotte wrote:

'Wildfell Hall' it hardly appears to me desirable to preserve. The choice of subject in that work is a mistake – it was too little consonant with the character – tastes and ideas of the gentle, retiring, inexperienced writer. She wrote it under a strange, conscientious, half-ascetic notion of accomplishing a painful penance and a severe duty … She had in the course of her life, been called on to contemplate, near at hand and for a long time, the terrible effects of talents misused and faculties abused; hers was naturally a sensitive, reserved and dejected nature; what she saw sank very deeply into her mind; it did her harm. She brooded over it till she believed it to be a duty to reproduce every detail as a warning to others.

Subsequent critics paid less attention to Anne's work because of this, and some dismissed her as "a Brontë without genius". However, since the mid-20th century, her life and works have been given greater attention. Biographies by Winifred Gérin (1959), Elizabeth Langland (1989) and Edward Chitham (1991), as well as Juliet Barker's group biography, The Brontës (1994; revised edition 2010), and work by critics such as Inga-Stina Ewbank, Marianne Thormählen, Laura C Berry, Jan B Gordon, Mary Summers, and Juliet McMaster have led to acceptance of Anne Brontë as a major literary figure. Sally McDonald of the Brontë Society said in 2013 that in some ways Anne "is now viewed as the most radical of the sisters, writing about tough subjects such as women's need to maintain independence and how alcoholism can tear a family apart." In 2016 Lucy Mangan championed Anne Brontë in the BBC's Being the Brontës.

== Works ==
- Bell, Currer; Bell, Ellis; Bell, Acton (1846). Poems.
- Bell, Acton (1847). Agnes Grey.
- Bell, Acton (1848). The Tenant of Wildfell Hall.

== See also ==
- List of feminist literature – 1840s
