= A Book of Ryhmes =

1829 book of poems by Charlotte Brontë

A Book of Ryhmes is a miniature book of poems by Charlotte Brontë. It was written in 1829 when Brontë was aged 13. The book is part of the collections of the Brontë Parsonage Museum in Haworth, West Yorkshire.

A Book of Ryhmes (the word rhymes is misspelt) is one of six miniature books written by the teenage Brontë, forming part of her juvenilia. Dated 17 December 1829, it measures only 3.8 in × 2.5 in (9.7 cm × 6.4 cm).

The book sold for $520 in an auction at Walpole Galleries in New York City in 1916 (equivalent to $15,026 in 2024). The last of Brontë's miniature books to be owned by a private collector, its location was subsequently unknown until April 2022 when it was announced that it would be for sale at the New York International Antiquarian Book Fair later that month. It sold for $1.25 million (£983,500), making it possibly the most expensive book ever sold, in terms of price per unit of surface area.

The book was purchased by a British literary charity, the Friends of the National Libraries, which donated it to the Brontë Parsonage Museum. The estate of T. S. Eliot and the Garfield Weston Foundation donated funds to the Friends of the National Libraries to assist in buying the book. The principal curator of the Brontë Parsonage Museum, Ann Dinsdale, said that it was "... always emotional when an item belonging to the Brontë family is returned home and this final little book, coming back to the place it was written when it had been thought lost, is very special for us." At the time that it acquired A Book of Ryhmes, the museum already had nine other miniature books made by the Brontë siblings, and expected to receive seven more from the Honresfield Library in the near future.

== Contents ==
The Book of Ryhmes has 15 pages with handstitched brown paper covers. It contains 10 poems. The title page is inscribed "Ryhmes. Sold by Nobody. And printed by Herself".

=== List of poems ===
The contents of the book were listed by Brontë in her 1830 list of her work to date. The text of the poems was unknown until the 2022 rediscovery of the book, having never been transcribed or summarised.

1. "The Beauty of Nature"
2. "A Short Poem"
3. "Meditations while Journeying in a Canadian Forest"
4. "Song of an Exile"
5. "On Seeing the Ruins of the Tower of Babel"
6. "A Thing of 14 Lines"
7. "Lines written on the Bank of a River one fine Summer Evening"
8. "Spring, a Song"
9. "Autumn, a Song"

== Publication ==
The Book of Ryhmes received its first publication 21 April 2025 by the Brontë Society and Tartarus Press. The book has facsimile reproductions of the original pages of the manuscript, with a transcription of the poems. Additionally, it has an Introduction by Patti Smith, and essays by Barbara Heritage and Henry Wessells.

== See also ==
- Glass Town
- The Young Men's Magazine
- List of most expensive books and manuscripts
