= Chris Wright (disambiguation) =

Chris Wright (born 1965) is an American businessman and government official.

Chris or Christopher Wright may also refer to:

== Sports ==
=== Basketball ===
- Chris Wright (basketball, born 1988), American basketball player
- Chris Wright (basketball, born 1989), American basketball player
- Chris Wright (basketball coach), American basketball coach

=== Other sports ===
- C. W. Anderson (Christopher Wright, born 1971), American professional wrestler
- Chris Wright (Canadian football) (1972–2005), Canadian football player
- Chris Wright (cricketer) (born 1985), English cricketer
- Chris Wright (footballer) (born 1986), English footballer
- Chris Wright (swimmer) (born 1988), Australian swimmer

== Others ==
- Christopher Wright (plotter) (c. 1570–1605), English conspirator in the Gunpowder Plot
- Chris Wright (music industry executive) (born 1944), British businessman
- Christopher J. H. Wright (born 1947), Anglican clergyman and Old Testament scholar
- Christopher Wright (composer) (1954–2024), British music teacher and composer
- Chris Wright (activist) (born 1957), American cannabis rights activist
- Christopher Wright (author) (born 1964), American fiction writer
- Christopher Wright (archivist), British academic
- Chris Wright (anthropologist), British visual anthropologist
- Chris Wright (programmer) (21st century), Computer programmer
