= Honresfield Library =

The Honresfield Library, also called the Blavatnik Honresfield Library, is an exceptional British collection of literary manuscripts and printed books assembled as a private library in the 19th century. In 2021, it was purchased by the Friends of the Nations' Libraries and donated to institutions across the United Kingdom, including the British Library, the Bodleian Library and the National Library of Scotland.

== Origins ==
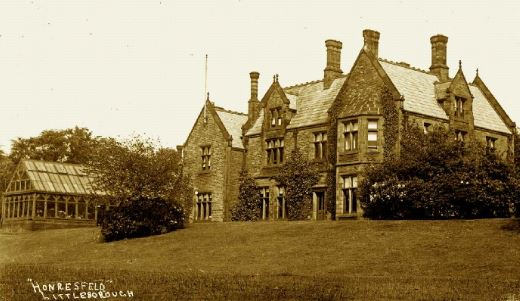
Honresfeld House

William Law (1835–1901) was a mill owner and wool manufacturer in Lancashire, England, whose home from 1873 onwards was Honresfeld or Honresfield House near Littleborough. He collected books, manuscripts, and paintings, taking a particular interest in Jane Austen, the Brontës, Robert Burns, Lord Byron, and Sir Walter Scott.

== Contents ==
The Honresfield Library was a significant private library collected during the nineteenth century. It includes a remarkable collection of rare English and Scottish literary manuscripts, first editions and annotated copies of printed books and other rare ephemeral works such as chapbooks. It features handwritten works by the Bronte sisters, letters by novelist Elizabeth Gaskell, manuscripts by Sir Walter Scott and Robert Burns; and early editions by Jane Austen, Horace Walpole, Charles Dickens and more.

It included seven of Charlotte Bronte's famous 'little books', a manuscript collection of poems by Anne Bronte, c.25 autograph letters by Charlotte Bronte and a holograph notebook by Emily Bronte containing 31 poems. The printed treasures include Emily Bronte's own annotated copy of their first publication, the exceptionally rare Poems of 1846 and presentation copies of their novels.

Jane Austen is represented in two important letters to her sister Cassandra - one is the earliest known surviving autograph letter by Austen.

== Sale and acquisition ==
William Law remained unmarried and lived with his brother Alfred at Honresfield House. After Alfred and William's deaths, the library was inherited by their nephew Sir Alfred Law. When he died in 1939, the collection slipped into obscurity and was feared lost or dispersed.

Law's descendants offered the collection for auction through Sotheby's in 2021. The Friends of the National Libraries led a fundraising campaign to acquire the collection for the nation. The family foundation of the Soviet born oligarch Len Blavatnik offered to contribute £7.5 million if matched funding could be found to meet the asking price of £15 million, which was achieved by the end of 2021, including £4 million from the National Heritage Memorial Fund.

== A distributed collection ==
The Friends of the National Libraries donated the collection to a range of public and university libraries and museums across the United Kingdom, some with joint ownership. Material relating to Charlotte, Emily and Anne Bronte was divided between the British Library, The Bronte Parsonage Museum in Haworth and the Brotherton Library at the University of Leeds. The Jane Austen material was divided between the Bodleian Library, Oxford and Jane Austen's House in Chawton. The National Library of Scotland and Abbotsford shared the Sir Walter Scott material and the National Library of Scotland and the Robert Burns Birthplace Museum split the Robert Burns material. Authors' manuscripts are now in Jane Austen's House, the Brontë Parsonage Museum, the Robert Burns Birthplace Museum, and Walter Scott's home Abbotsford.

== General references ==
- Bernard Pratt, The Honresfeld Library: the Law family and the mills which supported it, Littleborough's Industrial History no. 2 (Littleborough Historical & Archaeological Society, revised 2024)
- Neil Hoare, Kathryn Sutherland and Joan Winterkorn (editors), The Blavatnik Honresfield Library: saved for the nation (Friends of the National Libraries, 2023)
