= Dering Roll =

13th-century English list of coats of arms

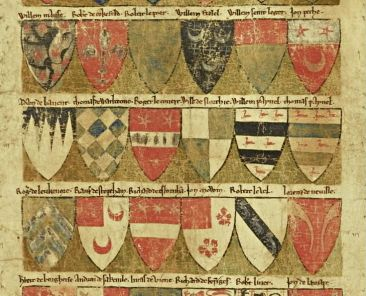
- An excerpt from the Dering Roll
- Material: Paint on vellum
- Size: 264.5 centimetres (104.1 in) x 21 centimetres (8.3 in)
- Present location: The British Library

The Dering Roll is the oldest English roll of arms surviving in its original form. It was made between 1270 and 1280 and contains the coat of arms of 324 knights, starting with two illegitimate children of King John. Sir Edward Dering acquired the roll during the 17th century and modified it to include a fictitious ancestor of his own. It was eventually purchased by the British Library (as Add. Roll 77720) following fundraising involving a number of other charities and individuals.

Glover's Roll, made in 1586, is a copy of a now lost roll dating from even earlier, from the reign of King Henry III (1216–1272).

== Description ==
The Dering Roll depicts the coats of arms of around a quarter of the English baronage during the era of Edward I. Emphasis was given to knights from Sussex and Kent, as it was produced in Dover between 1270 and 1280 and the document was designed to list the knights who owed feudal service there. It depicts 324 coats of arms, beginning with Richard Fitz Roy and William de Say, two of King John's illegitimate sons. The shields are arranged in 54 rows, with six shields on each line. Above each shield reads the knight's name, except in six cases where it has been omitted or removed. Stephen de Pencester may have commissioned the roll during his time as Constable of Dover Castle.

== Dering's amendment ==
Sir Edward Dering acquired the Roll whilst lieutenant of Dover Castle, and made his modification after 1638, removing the coat of arms of Nicholas de Crioll and inserting his own coat of arms with a fictitious ancestor named Richard Fitz Dering in order to improve the history of his own family. This appears adjacent to the shield for Thomas de Marines (or a cross engrailed gules).

The trail of Richard fitz Dering (built upon sources dependent upon Dering's collections) leads, or was intended to lead, to the manor of Heyton in Stanford, Kent (where the supposed FitzDering connection with Marinis or Morinis is given credence by Edward Hasted), and is exemplified by charters like that in Thomas Willement's hands. A descent through a branch of the de Haute family of Wadenhall, Waltham, Kent was then indicated, but Sir Edward Dering's constructive approach to genealogy leaves many of the sources bedevilled by doubts of authenticity.

== Recent ownership ==
During the 20th century it was acquired by Sir Anthony Wagner.

On 4 December 2007, the roll was sold at auction at Sotheby's for the sum of £192,000 to a private individual who subsequently applied for an export licence. The Department for Culture, Media and Sport placed a temporary block on the roll being moved overseas and the British Library led efforts to purchase it, after the Reviewing Committee on the Export of Works of Art confirmed it to be of sufficient importance and significance. The library raised £194,184 to acquire the roll; the Head of Medieval and Earlier Manuscripts, Claire Breay said of the purchase, "the acquisition of the Dering Roll provides an extremely rare chance to add a manuscript of enormous local and national significance." They were assisted in funding the purchase from the Art Fund (£40,000), the National Heritage Memorial Fund (£100,000), Friends of the British Library (£10,000), Friends of the National Libraries (£10,000), and a number of individual benefactors.

It is now on display at the Sir John Ritblat Gallery in the British Library, and available to researchers in the library's manuscripts reading room.

== Modern illustrations of arms ==
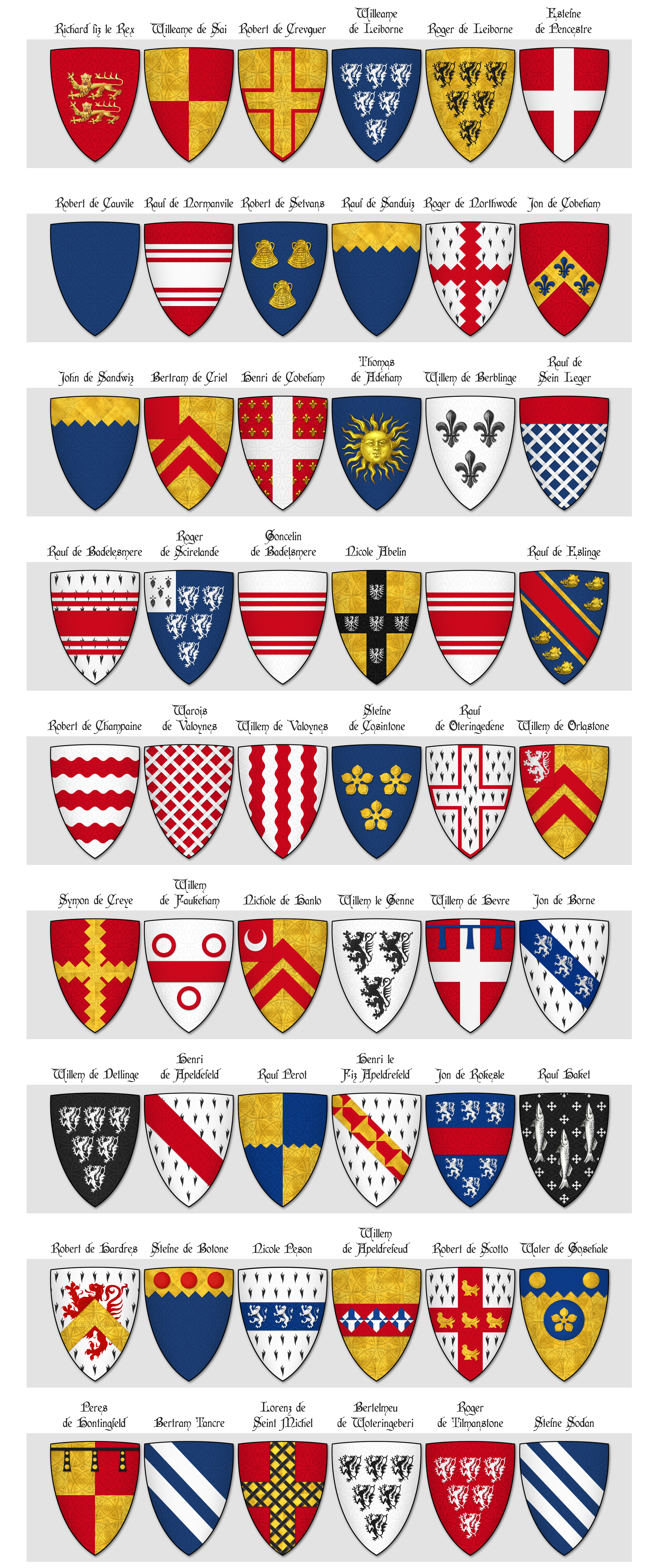
Panel 1: 1–54

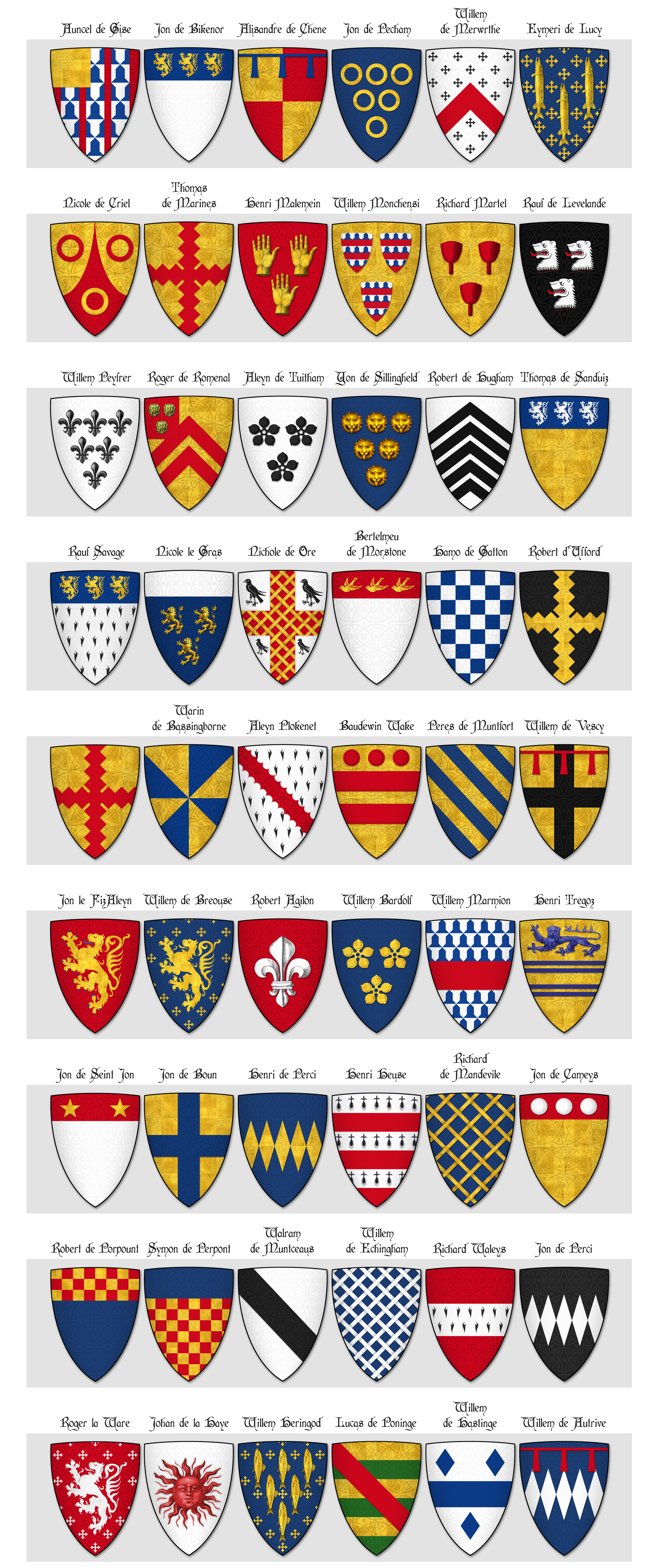
Panel 2: 55–108

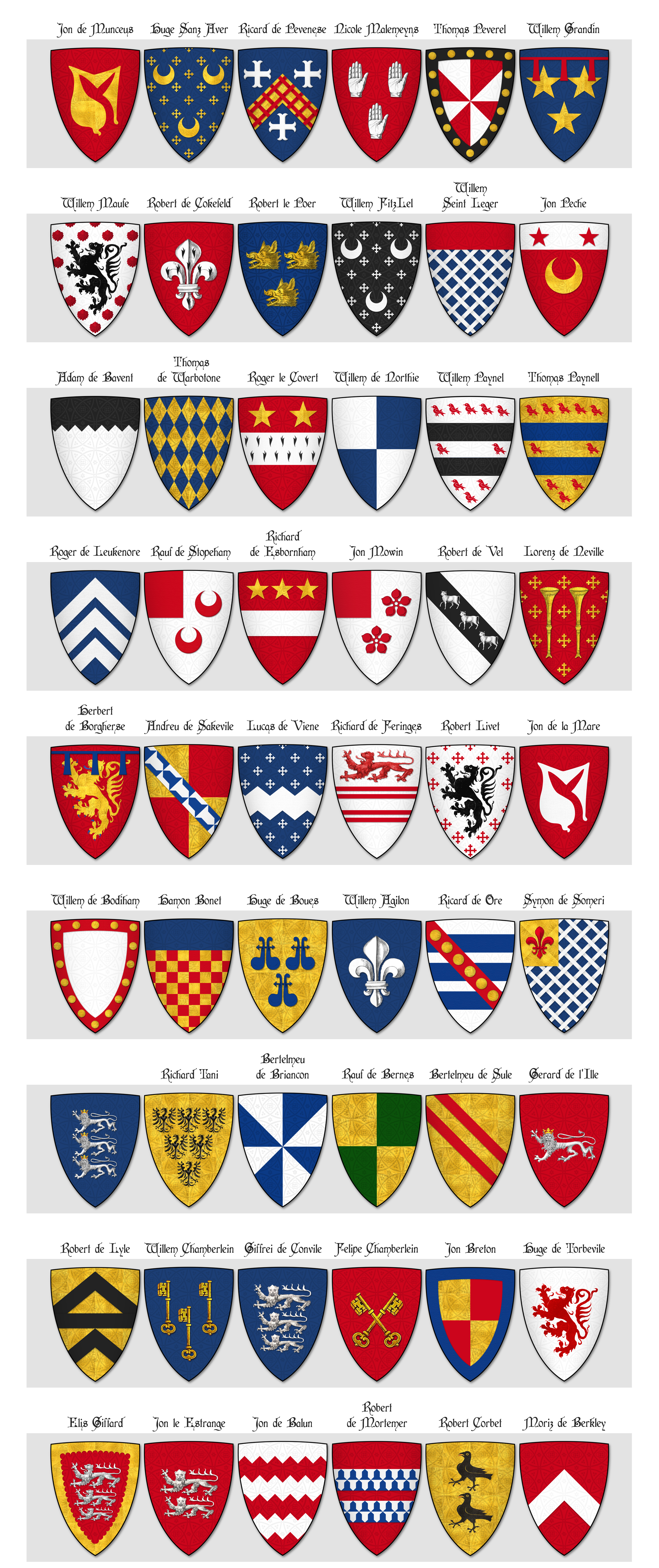
Panel 3: 109–162

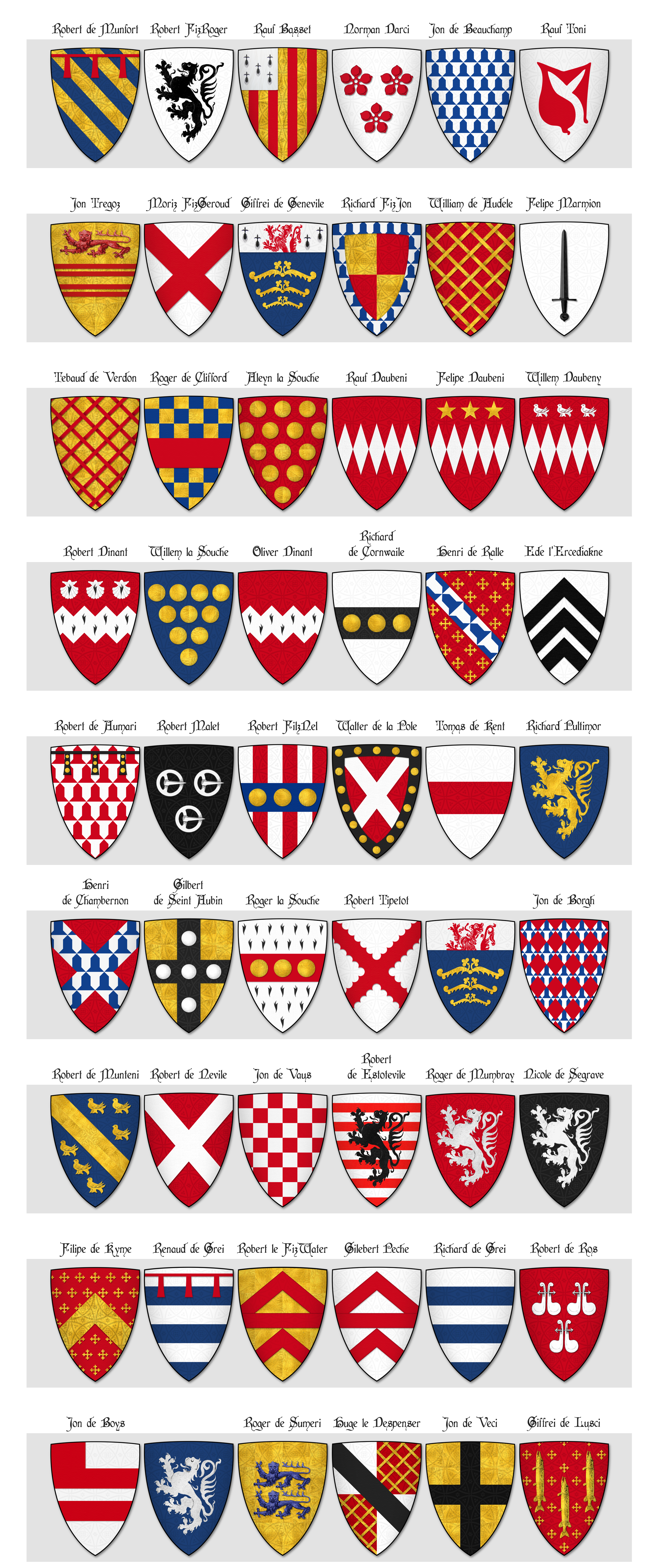
Panel 4: 163–216

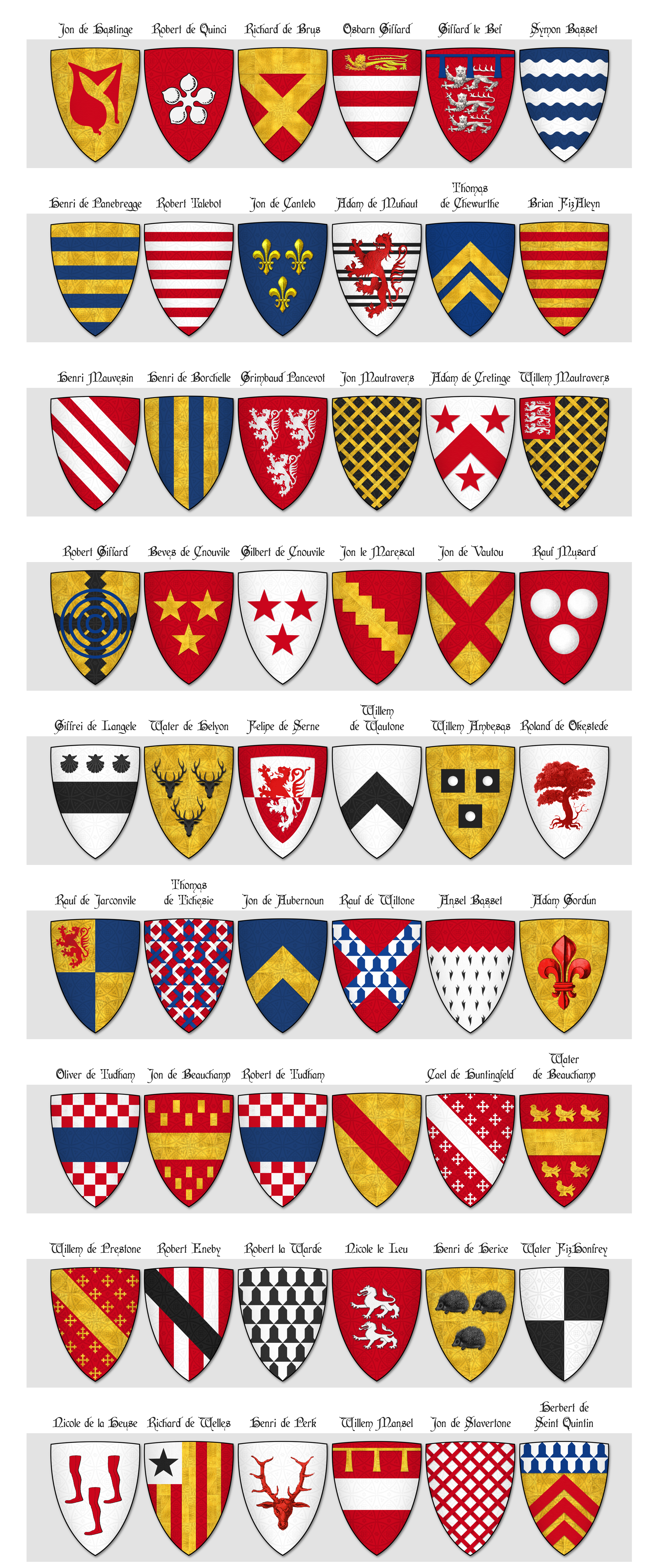
Panel 5: 217–270

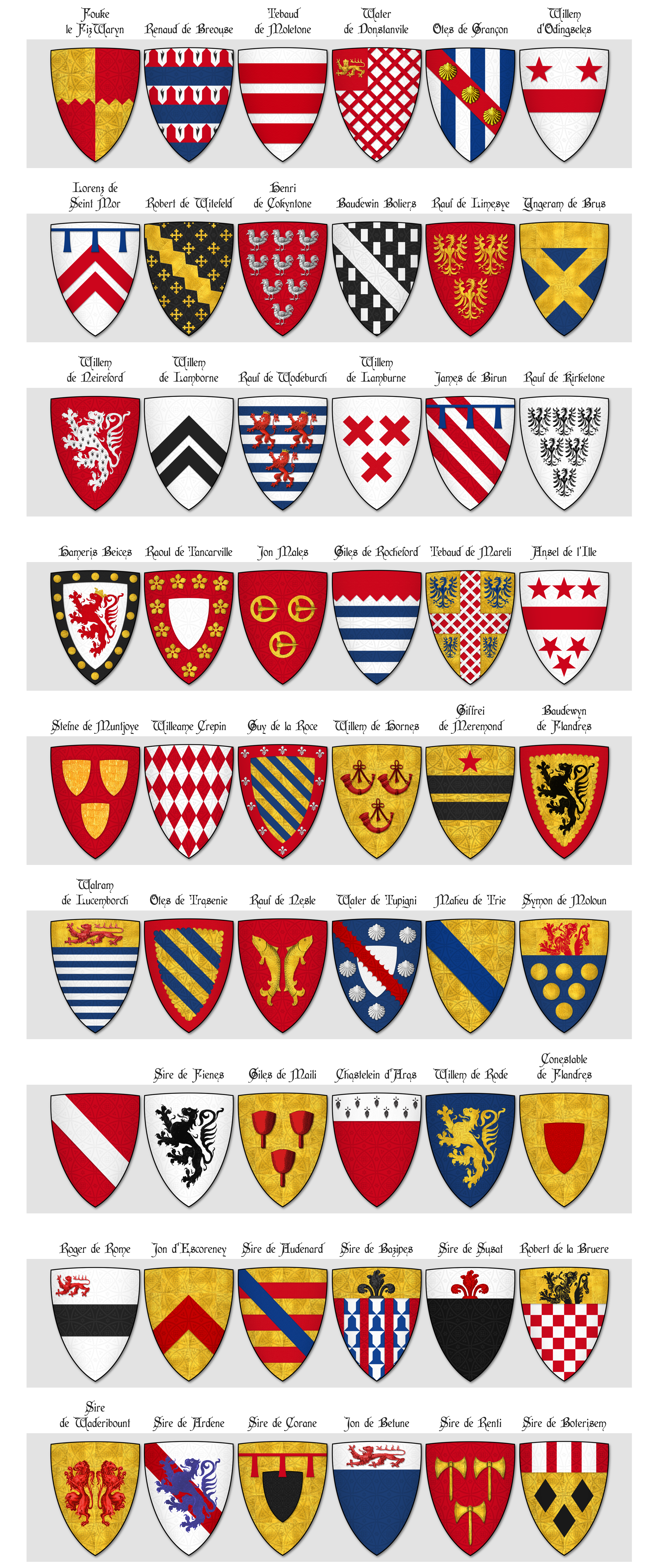
Panel 6: 271–324
