= Glass Town =

19th century British paracosm

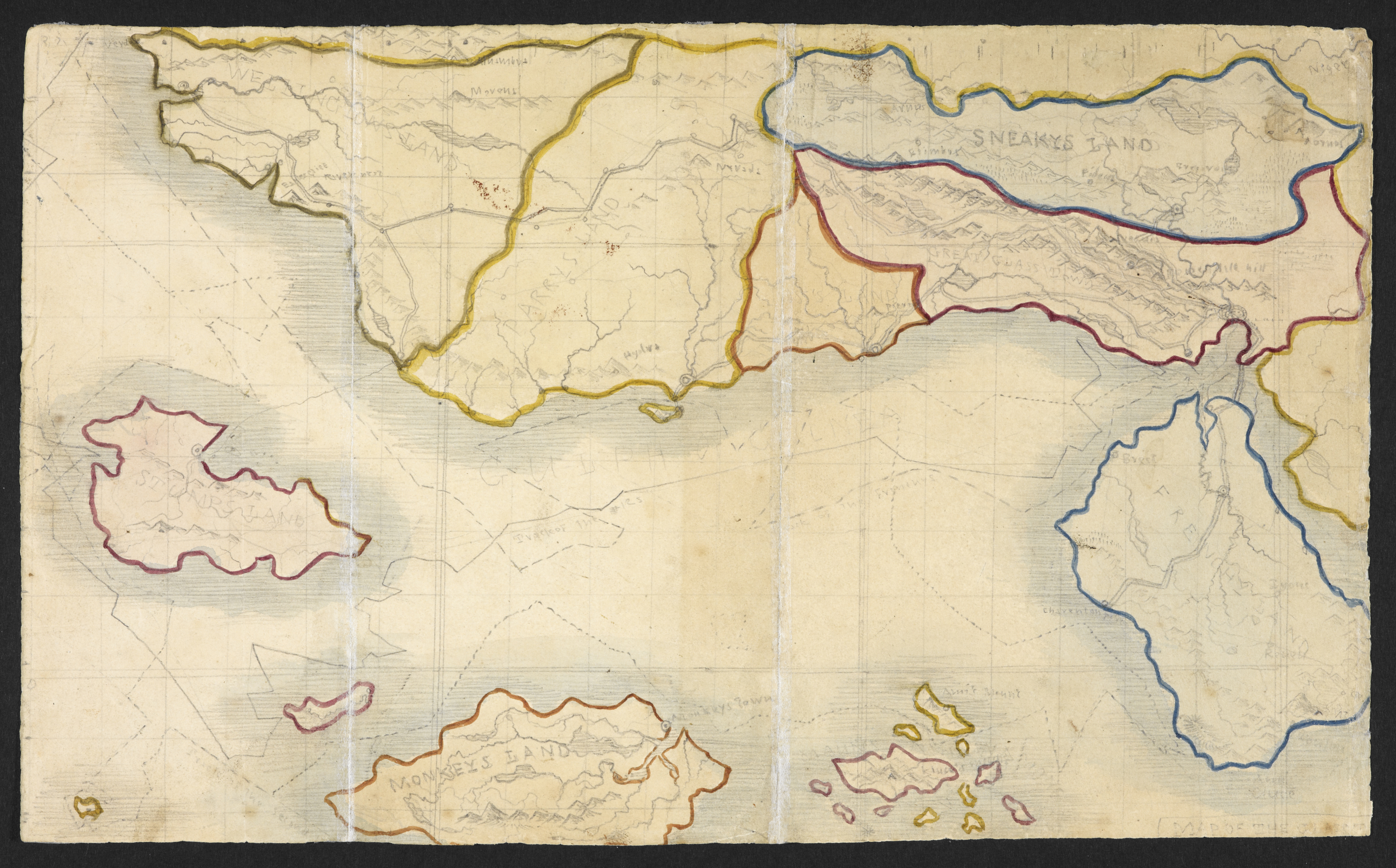
Map of the Glass Town Federation and surrounding lands in The History of the Young Men from their First Settlement to the Present Time by Branwell Brontë, c. 1830–31.

The Glass Town is a paracosm created and written as a shared fantasy world by Charlotte Brontë, Branwell Brontë, Emily Brontë and Anne Brontë, siblings of the Brontë family. It was initiated by Charlotte and her brother Branwell; Emily and Anne Brontë later participated in further developing the stories and geography of its world, although they later broke away to create an alternative land of their own, Gondal, while Charlotte stayed loyal to Angria.

The Glass Town writings began in December 1827, and as largely unfinished manuscripts, they constitute the juvenilia of the Brontë siblings.

== History ==
The Brontë siblings began writing prose and poetry related to their paracosmic fantasy world in the 1820s, and in December 1827 produced a novel, Glass Town. Glass Town began when twelve wooden soldiers were offered to Branwell Brontë by his father, Patrick Brontë, on 5 June 1826. Branwell shared his soldiers with his sisters, and each claimed one and named it. Referred to collectively by the siblings as the “Young Men”, or “The Twelves”, the soldiers formed the basis of a series of increasingly intricate games or plays, set in a fictional world loosely based on Western Africa.

Of this, Charlotte writes:

Papa brought Branwell some soldiers at Leeds. When Papa came home it was night and we were in bed, so next morning Branwell came to our door with a box of soldiers. Emily and I jumped out of bed and I snatched up one and exclaimed: “This is the Duke of Wellington! It shall be mine!” when I had said this, Emily likewise took one up and said it should be hers; when Anne came down, she said one should be hers. Mine was the prettiest of the whole, and the tallest, and the most perfect in every part. Emily’s was a grave-looking fellow, and we called him “Gravey”. Anne’s was a queer little thing, much like herself. He was called Waiting Boy. Branwell chose Bonaparte. March 12, 1829.

It was only during December 1827 that this world really took shape, when Charlotte suggested that everyone own and manage their own island, which they named after heroic leaders: Charlotte had Wellington, Branwell had Sneaky, Emily had Parry, and Anne had Ross. Each island's capital was called Glass Town, hence the name of the Glass Town Confederacy. The Confederacy gradually expanded to become part of a larger country called Angria. The sagas created by the siblings were episodic and elaborate, and they exist in incomplete manuscripts, some of which have been published as juvenilia. The creation, expansion and population of this imaginary world provided the siblings with a consuming interest during childhood and early adolescence, and also prepared them for literary vocations in adulthood. "Much of the saga was formulated only in discussion amongst the creators; knowledge was assumed between the collaborators, who had no need to explain circumstances or background in individual stories".

Between 1829 and 1830, Charlotte produced a dozen issues for the siblings' The Young Men's Magazine and an additional four volumes of Tales of the Islanders (about twenty thousand words) along with numerous long stories, plays and poems, as well as a catalogue to keep track of her work. Charlotte, in private letters, called Angria "her 'world below', a private escape where she could act out her desires and multiple identities". Charlotte enjoyed the depiction of "romantic settings, passionate relationships, and high society" whereas Branwell enjoyed battles and politics. Although their younger sisters did not initially contribute to the same degree, there remains the sense that all four siblings were invested from the start. At the beginning Branwell directed the action, often writing "long parliamentary speeches and war epics".

However, from 1831 onwards, Emily and Anne 'seceded' from the Glass Town Confederacy to create a 'spin-off' called Gondal, which included many of their poems. This occurred at the time when Charlotte left her siblings to go and study at Roe Head. Emily and Anne kept writing about their world "into early adulthood".

== World and characters ==
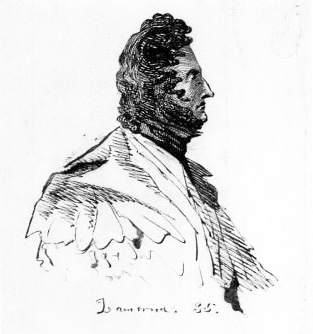
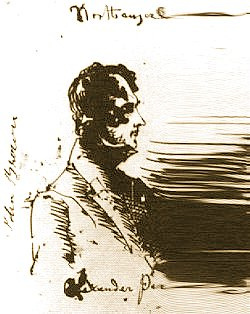
Portraits of Zamorna and Northangerland by Branwell Brontë, c. 1835.

Glass Town was built around "the Great Bay at the confluence of rivers" in a fictional West Africa. The manuscripts were originally centred on "the Glass Town Federation and its principal city Verdopolis (initially called the Great Glass Town), and then moved to Angria, a new kingdom created in 1834 to the west of the Federation. [...] The Brontës filled this imaginative space with their own version of early nineteenth-century society with its international relations and domestic affairs [...]. Wars and political upheavals dominate the events of the saga throughout its history".

In an early manuscript (1826–28) by Charlotte Brontë, "there is a map, which is carefully divided into four provinces (one for each sibling). The two lists of places explain what belongs to Wellington and what belongs to Parry". According to the British Museum, the Brontë siblings named their toy soldiers "the Twelves or ‘Young Men’ and created names and personalities that brought them to life. [...] As Wellington was Charlotte’s ‘Young Man’ and Parry was Emily’s, this is evidence of a partnership of the imagination between the two sisters. The mention of the toy soldiers dates the little book to at least 1826, when the toy soldiers were given to the children".

In the manuscript The History of the Young Men (1830–31) by Branwell Brontë, Branwell chronicled the establishment of the Glass Town Federation colony by "twelve adventurers who set sail for West Africa" from his persona of Glass Town historian Captain John Bud. In this manuscript, "Branwell drew a map of the Glass Town Federation complete with mountain ranges, rivers and trade routes. It shows the four kingdoms run by the siblings: Wellington’s Land, Parry’s Land, Ross’s Land and Sneaky’s Land. Being the baby of the family, Anne has the diminutive kingdom of Ross's Land. [...] Also shown on the map, outlined in red, is the cosmopolitan district. This contains the Great Glass Town capital, (later known as ‘Verreopolis’ or ‘Verdopolis’). This grew to be a thriving city of factories, prisons, palaces and dungeons. As explained in the history, it even has a labyrinthine network of caves beneath, harbouring criminals and low life".

Early characters were "literal transmogrifications of Wellington and Napoleon", however, the Brontës eventually "focused on developing two of their own characters [...]: Zamorna, the Duke of Wellington's son, and Alexander Percy, known throughout the later works as Northangerland. [...] Although both were regular characters in Charlotte and Branwell's early Glass Town writings [...], it is not until 1834, the siblings' new kingdom Angria, and Zamorna's subsequent marriage to Northangerland's daughter, Mary, that the duo's incredible dynamic is fully unleashed. [...] Betrayal and revenge are paramount in the Angrian saga".

== Existing versions ==
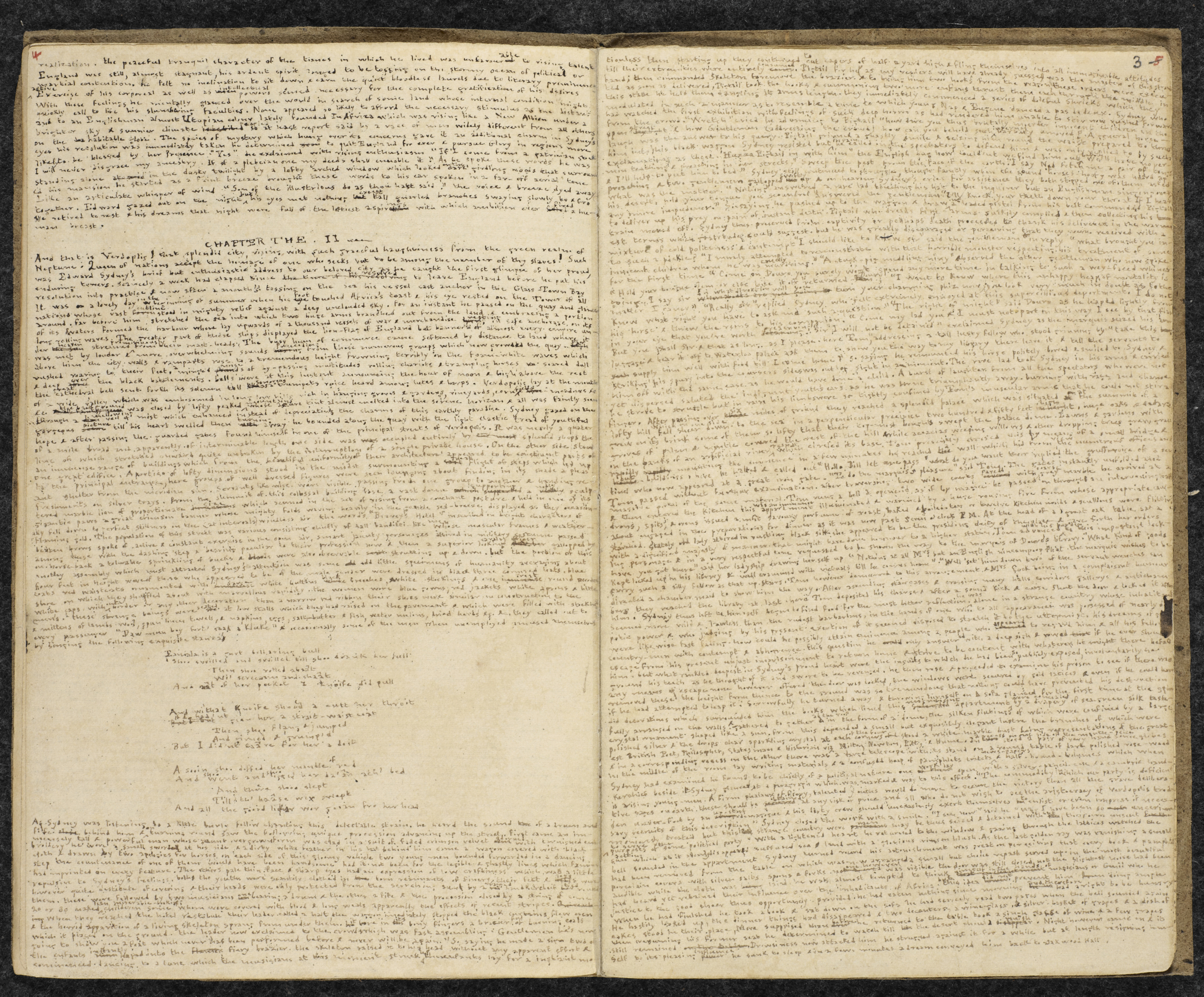
Charlotte Brontë's manuscript The Foundling (1833) is part of the British Library's collection. Set in Verdopolis and "sub-titled ‘A Tale of Our Own Times’, the story has magical elements but also touches on themes relevant to Victorian society, such as child cruelty, social class, orphans and inheritance".

"In 1829 and 1830, Charlotte and Branwell cobbled the pages together from printed waste and scrap paper, perhaps cut from margins of discarded pamphlets. They wrote with steel-nibbed pens, which tend to blot, yet the even script demonstrates their practiced hand". These hand-bound books measure about 2.5 by 5 centimeters. "Only about 20 volumes of Brontë juvenilia are known to remain. Harvard holds nine, the Brontë Museum at the family home in England owns a few, and the remaining are scattered among museums and private collectors". Harvard's collection originated from when Arthur Bell Nicholls, Charlotte’s husband, sold volumes "after her death to a collector, who gave them to poet and fellow collector Amy Lowell; she donated the set to Houghton Library in 1925".

In the 1970s, Christine Alexander, of the University of New South Wales, began to track down the Brontë juvenilia to transcribe and organize it; when she began, "only about a third of the manuscripts had been published". Thomas James Wise had acquired a large amount of the manuscripts from Nicholis and "subsequently sold off most of the collection in small bits and pieces [...]. Over ten publicly accessible repositories in the U.S. and England contain significant amounts of manuscripts, sometimes dividing single works among them; and numerous private collectors and other libraries have a page or more, all of which had to be found, identified, dated and virtually stitched into original places to create the chronological record". In addition to contacting libraries and archives, Alexander traced old sales catalogues and "travelled all over the United States and Canada on a Greyhound bus, knocking on doors of private collectors, eventually finding more than 100 unpublished Charlotte Bronte manuscripts and an equal number of unknown drawings and paintings by the Brontes". Alexander has over the decades since continued to publish an updated catalogue on the various locations of the manuscripts, including private collections.

The Bronte Parsonage Museum purchased one of these manuscripts in 2019. The New York Times reported that "the 19-page, 4,000-word manuscript measures about 1.5 by 2.5 inches. It features vividly dramatic hand-lettered ads [...], as well as three stories set in the fictional settlement of Glass Town, including one featuring a scene that seems to be a precursor to the famous one in 'Jane Eyre' where Mr. Rochester’s wife sets fire to his bed. The Brontë Parsonage already owns four of the six volumes of The Young Men’s Magazine. (The whereabouts of the remaining one have been unknown since around 1930, according to the museum)".

== Reception ==
Upon the publication of Tales of Glass Town, Angria, and Gondal: Selected Writings by Oxford World's Classics, The Guardian highlighted that the Brontë siblings created depictions of "fantastical, magical kingdoms, steeped in violence, politics, lust and betrayal. [...] Written in dozens of miniature books, these manuscripts – with curious, secretive titles such as A Peep into a Picture Book, The Spell, A Leaf from an Unopened Volume – are not only an astonishing example of craftsmanship, but contain extraordinary, uncensored content". Claire Harman, a British biographer, highlighted that the Brontë juvenilia consists of poetry, plays, and magazines "with accompanying maps and histories" and is over 50,000 words; "much of it set in imaginary places like Glass Town and Angria, with interlocking casts of countless characters. Harman compares it aptly to computer gaming — although the Brontes created it all from scratch".

In 2011, the Brontë juvenilia was included in a science fiction-focused exhibition at the British Library. Guest curator Andy Sawyer pointed "to the way the Brontës created favourite characters and settings in the same way science fiction and fantasy fans now play in the detailed imaginary 'universes' of Star Trek or Harry Potter" and said "the sense of fantasy is strong and there are examples of what might be called the beginnings of science fiction". Culture24 highlighted that "the Brontës featured themselves as Gods in their worlds, of which they wrote long sagas in tiny micro-script, as well as using both fictional and real-life characters, reminiscent of the creations of JRR Tolkein [sic] and CS Lewis. [...] Glass Town originated from games the children would play with toy soldiers and its map, drawn by Branwell, was based on a map on real explorations of America in the 19th Century".

Christine Alexander, a Brontë juvenilia historian, wrote that "this fictitious world established in Africa bears little resemblance to Africa [...] [and] owes as much to fairy tale and the Arabian Nights as it does to geographical descriptions of what was known as 'the dark continent'". On the manuscript The History of the Young Men (1830–1831), the British Museum highlights that "it is impossible to ignore the imperialist ideology of the 19th century in this fictional history. This was an era when Britain was a global empire, one which was built on expansion and conquests, with little regard for native inhabitants. We see exactly this played out in the Brontës' imagined world. On reaching the shores of West Africa, the Twelves (as the company is known) set up a colonial outpost, and lay claim to land as their own. After building their first settlement – Twelves Town – they find themselves at war with the native Ashantee tribe. The Twelves win, which impresses the British Government. One of the Twelves, Arthur Wellesley, is chosen by the British to lead troops against the Emperor Napoleon. He defeats Napoleon and returns victorious to Glass Town where he becomes king". Emma Butcher wrote, in the Victorian Periodicals Review, that "the Brontë children grew up in an era when post-Waterloo commentary on events and personalities kept the Napoleonic Wars at the forefront of popular discussion. [...] The early writings of Glass Town (1829–34) adopted and reimagined historical and contemporary people, place names and events. [...] Although convoluted and fictional, Charlotte and Branwell's depiction of their juvenile heroes—first Wellington and Napoleon and then Zamorna and Northangerland—provides insight into contemporary reaction to Wellington's and Napoleon's eminent personalities".

== In popular culture ==
- In Catherynne M. Valente’s young-adult fiction novel The Glass Town Game (2017), "Glass Town turns into a Narnia-like world of its own, and the Brontës find themselves pulled through into their own creation".
- In the comic series Die (2018) by writer Kieron Gillen and artist Stephanie Hans, three of the locations on the icosahedron-shaped world are Gondal, Angria, and Glass Town based on the Brontë juvenilia.
- In Isabel Greenberg's 2020 graphic novel Glass Town, parts of the Brontë juvenilia are retold and intersected with the lives of four Brontë children.
- In Miriam Pultro's 2021 meta rock musical, Glass Town is a band the four Brontës have created together.
- In Nicola Friar's novel A Tale of Two Glass Towns, Glass Town has loosely inspired the forthcoming novel.
