= Canterbury Astrolabe Quadrant =

Medieval astrolabe found in England

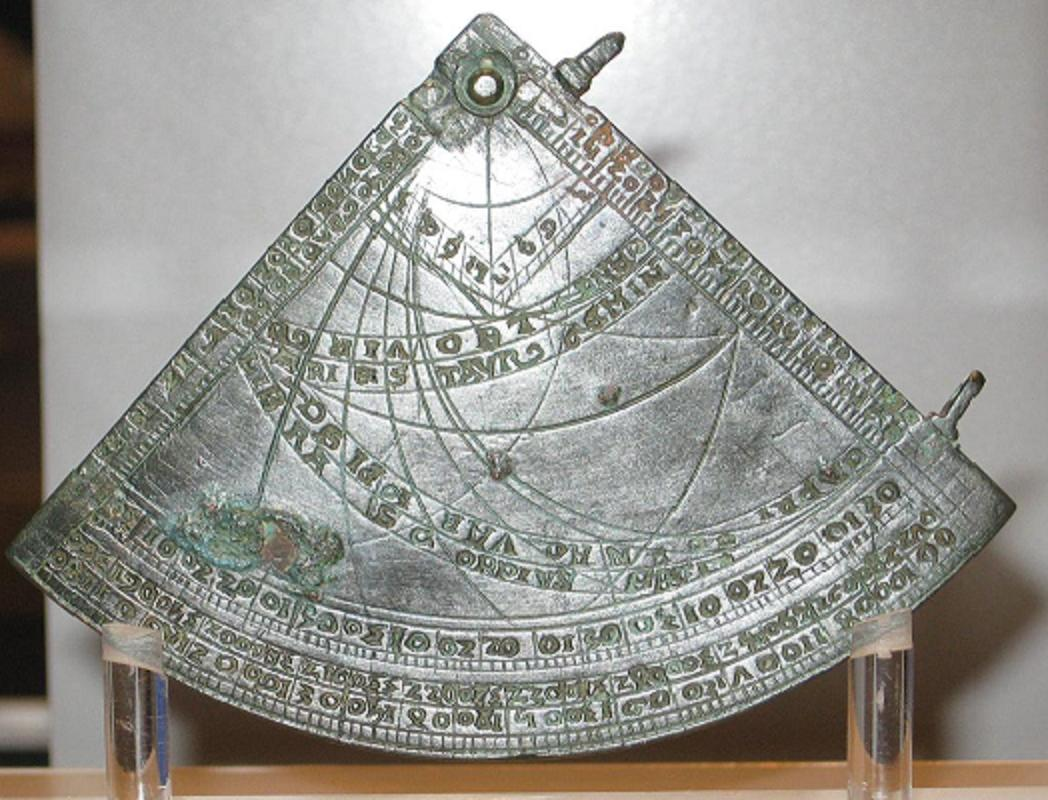
The Canterbury Astrolabe Quadrant. British Museum, London.

The Canterbury Astrolabe Quadrant is a medieval astrolabe believed to date from 1388, and which was found in an archaeological dig at the House of Agnes, a bed and breakfast hotel in Canterbury, Kent, England, in 2005.

The Canterbury Astrolabe Quadrant is the only one of its kind known to have been definitely made in England. Astrolabes are calculation instruments that enable their users to tell the time and determine their geographical latitude using the position of the sun and stars. An extremely rare instrument, the Canterbury Astrolabe Quadrant probably belonged to a travelling scholar who may have lost it in Canterbury while on pilgrimage to that city.

It is also the first astrolabe to have been found during an archaeological dig. Scientific instruments such as this are usually handed down from generation to generation or found among family possessions, but are rarely discovered in the ground.

The British Museum was originally outbid in an auction in 2007 for the brass astrolabe, but succeeded in having an export ban imposed on the device, one of only eight such instruments to have survived from the Middle Ages. The British Museum eventually purchased it in 2008 with £175,000 from The British Museum Friends plus grants of £125,000 from the National Heritage Memorial Fund and £50,000 from The Art Fund.

== See also ==
- List of astronomical instruments
