= The British Museum Friends =

British charitable organisation

- Abbreviation: BMF
- Formation: 1968
- Type: Charity
- Purpose: Supports the British Museum with grants for acquisitions, and assists with research programmes, conservation, and new technologies throughout the Museum.
- Location: British Museum
- Region served: England and Wales
- Members: 48,000 (March 2013)
- Parent organisation: British Museum
- Website: https://www.britishmuseum.org/join_in.aspx
- Remarks: Current Chairman: David Norgrove

The British Museum Friends (BMF) is a registered charitable organisation in the UK with close links to the British Museum, and was set up in 1968. It provides funding in the form of grants to the British Museum in order to support the educational objectives of the Museum including to allow the Museum to acquire new items and collections, and assists with financing research programmes, conservation, and new technologies throughout the Museum.

== Acquisitions ==
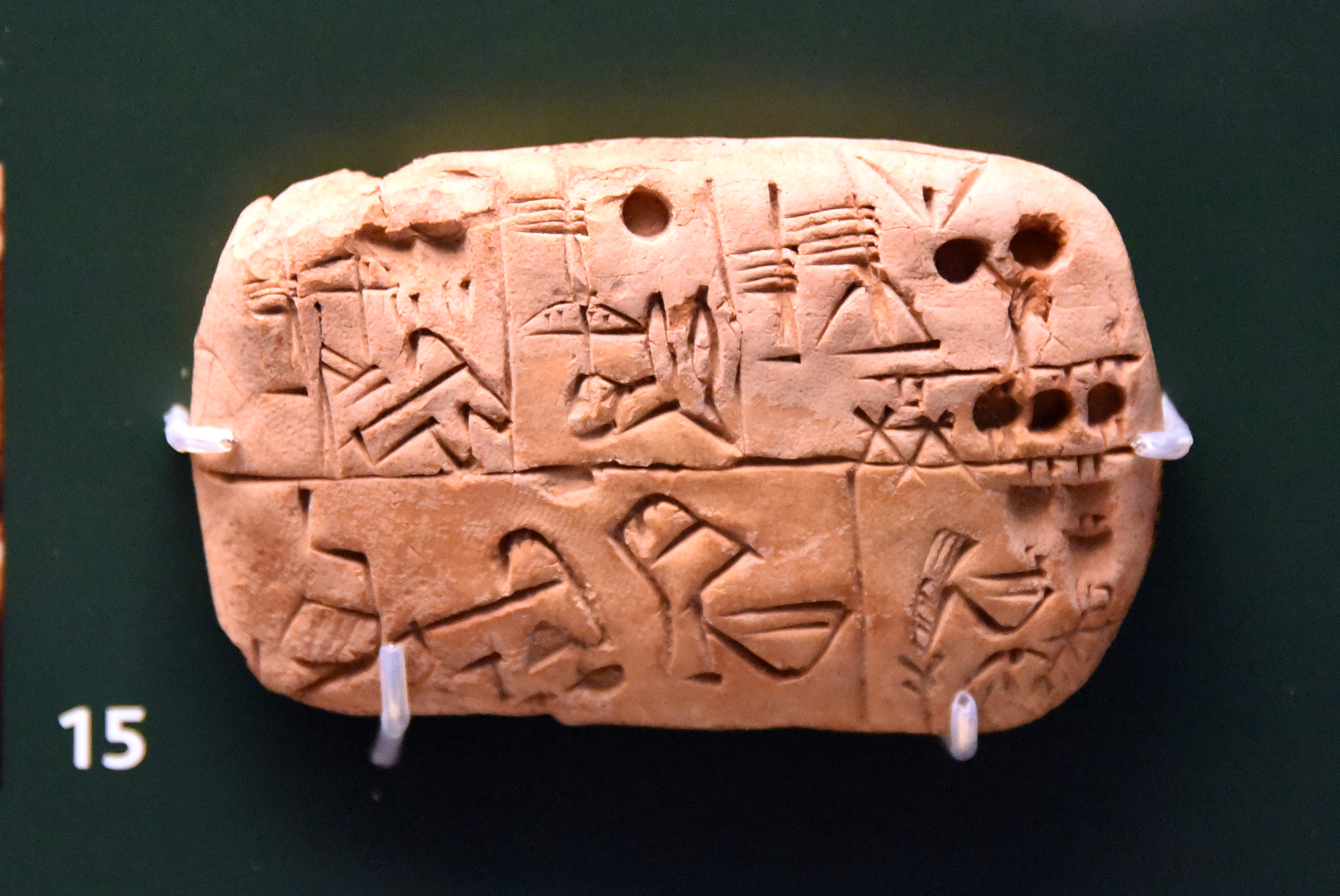
Clay tablet, late Uruk period, 3300–3100 BCE. Proto-cuneiform signs, food issue list "rations" written by combining a human head and a bowl. No provenance. Purchased via Christie's in 1989, with contribution from the British Museum Friends

Acquisitions supported by the BMF include the Nimrud Ivories, the Warren Cup, the Canterbury Astrolabe Quadrant, the Burney Relief, a Mycenaean terracotta group of three dancers in a ring, the gold mancus of Coenwulf, the Ringlemere Cup, the Vale of York Hoard and two very rare gold coins of the Roman Emperor Carausius found in the North Midlands in 2007.

Other acquisitions funded in whole or in part by the Friends during 2008–09 include the Chettle Park Hoard and twelve Greek papyri from Roman Egypt from the Oxyrhynchus Papyri.

== American Friends of the British Museum ==
The American Friends of the British Museum (AFBM) was set up in 1989 as a not-for-profit organisation whose principal purpose is raising awareness and financial support for the British Museum. Since its founding, American Friends of the British Museum has contributed over $30 million to support a variety of projects at the British Museum, including:

- The Queen Elizabeth II Great Court
- Special exhibitions
- Scholarly symposia
- Acquisitions
- Staff positions in the curatorial and education departments.

== See also ==
- Friends of the British Library
