= Christopher Wright (archivist) =

British manuscript curator

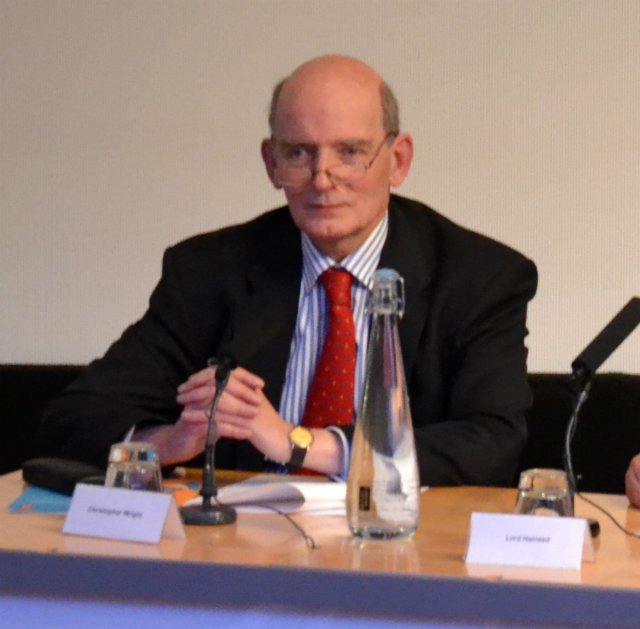
- Christopher Wright, photographed in 2013
- Scientific career
- Fields: Manuscripts
- Institutions: British Library

Christopher John Wright OBE FRHistS FSA is a former Head of Manuscripts at the British Library and Fellow of both the Royal Historical Society and the Society of Antiquaries of London. During his time at the library he oversaw several acquisitions, and in retirement became involved with the Friends of the British Library and the Reviewing Committee on the Export of Works of Art.

== British Library ==
Christopher Wright joined the Department of Manuscripts in 1974. In 2002, as Curator of Modern Historical Papers, he found a letter regarding Captain Thomas Howard Goad's death at the Battle of Balaclava in the Charge of the Light Brigade, written by Captain Goad's brother Cornet George Goad. It matched a letter bequeathed to the library in the previous year, written by Captain Soame Jenyns to Captain Goad's other brother, Charles.

In 2003 he became Head of Manuscripts, until his retirement in October 2005. During this time, along with colleague Michelle Paull, he was responsible for researching the library's acquisition of the Sir Arthur Conan Doyle collection and preparing it for exhibition, and received the Anthony Powell papers from Michael Meredith of the Eton College Collections.

In the 2006 New Year Honours, he was made an Officer of the Order of the British Empire. Speaking of his time as Head of Manuscripts following the award, he said, "I was caring for the national collection of manuscripts and acquiring them. We have had several exciting acquisitions during my time in charge, including the archive of Punch magazines. I think it acknowledges scholarship as worthwhile and it actually shows that work demanding patience and care is still important. One of the most satisfying parts of my job was that I was able to bring the collections to the general public through exhibitions."

Following his retirement, he became Deputy Chairman of the Friends of the British Library in February 2007, taking over from Don Pritchard.

== Fellowships and memberships ==
He has been a Fellow of the Royal Historical Society since 1982, and of Society of Antiquaries of London since May 2002.

In 2005, he was appointed as a member of the Department for Culture, Media and Sport's Reviewing Committee on the Export of Works of Art. As part of the committee's function, they were responsible for deferring the sale of a translation of the Italian opera Erismena, the earliest surviving opera score in the English language, dating from the 1670s.

== Bibliography ==
Writer

- Wright, Christopher (2005). George III. London: British Library. ISBN 978-0-7123-4893-5. OCLC 469872190

Editor

- Wright, C. J., ed. (1997). Sir Robert Cotton as Collector: essays on an early Stuart courtier and his legacy. London: British Library. ISBN 978-0-7123-0358-3. OCLC 882593171
- Wright, Christopher J.; Anderson, Glenda M., eds. (2013). The Victoria Cross and the George Cross: The Complete History (3 vols). York: Methuen & Co. ISBN 978-0-4137-7752-2.
