= Friends of the British Library =

Charity supporting the British Library in London

- Abbreviation: FBL
- Formation: 1989
- Type: Charity
- Purpose: Supports the British Library with grants for acquisitions, exhibitions, new equipment, facilities, and other activities.
- Location: 96 Euston Road, London, NW1 2DB
- Region served: Britain
- Remarks: Chairman: Dame Marina Warner

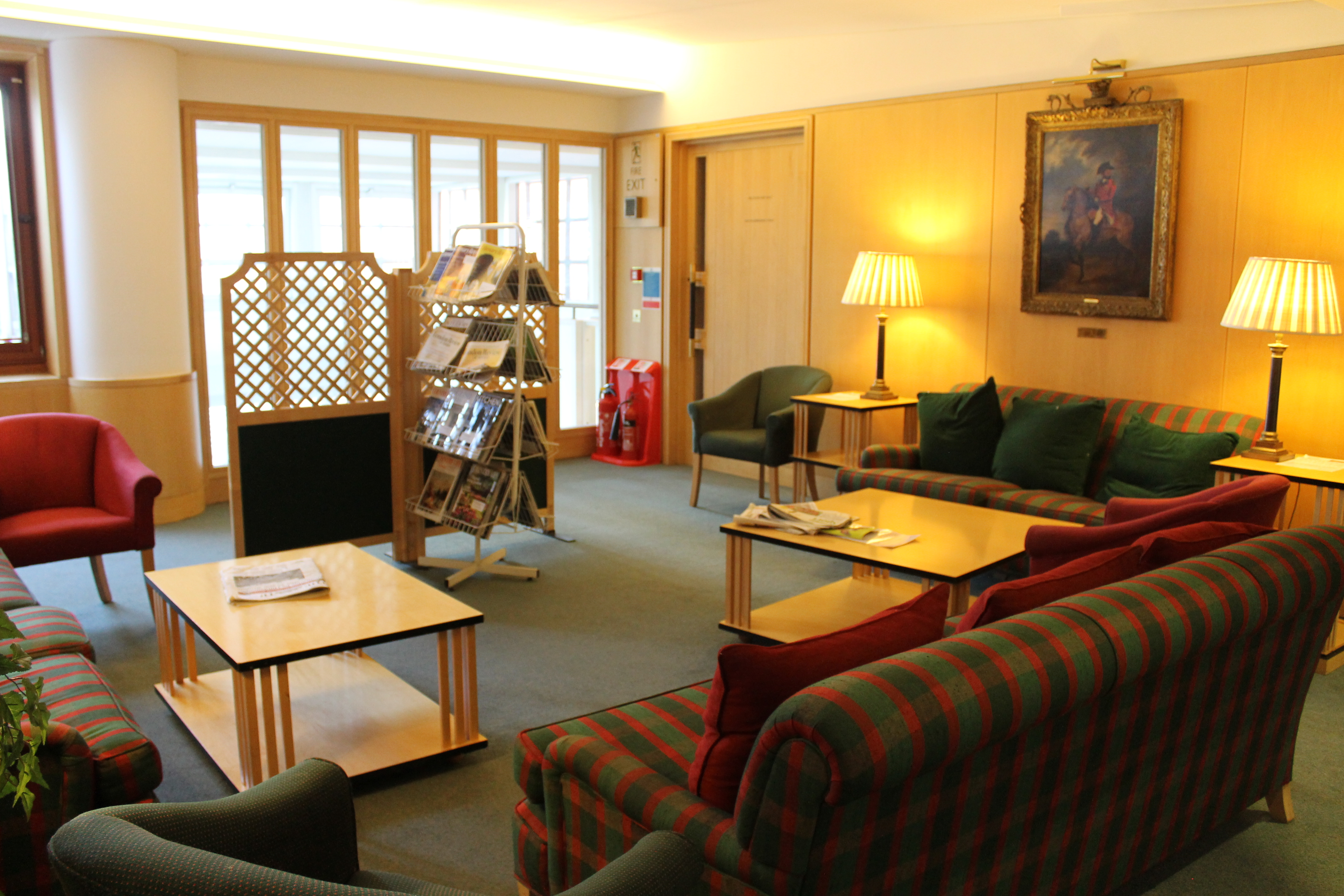
Interior of former Friends Room at the British Library

The Friends of the British Library is a registered charitable organisation in the UK with close links to the British Library. It provides funding in the form of grants to the British Library in order to allow the Library to acquire new items and collections, procure new equipment and facilities, and produce exhibitions.

== Origin ==
The inaugural meeting of the Friends was held on 12 January 1989 with the objective of "the education of the public by promotion, support, assistance and improvement of the British Library through the activities of a group of Friends". It operates under a written constitution as an unincorporated association and registered charity.

The Friends first President was Lord Eccles, a man heavily involved in the original creation of the British Library via the British Library Act 1972 as well as being the British Library's first Chairman. He would be President of the Friends from its creation in 1989 until his death in 1999. The first Chairman of the Friends of the British Library was Christopher Henry Beaumont Pease, 2nd Baron Wardington. He became a Vice President in 1994, and President in 1999 – a post he held until his death in 2005.

== President and council ==
The hierarchy of the Friends include a President, several Vice Presidents, a Chairman and deputy, and a council of members. The council members are trustees of the charity for the purposes of charity law.

Officers and members of the council are elected as required by the Constitution of the membership at each year's Annual General Meeting. The current President of the Friends is Robert Gascoyne-Cecil, 7th Marquess of Salisbury and the Vice Presidents consist of Lord Bragg of Wigton, Frank Field MP, William Hague MP, Lord Hameed, Lord Jones of Birmingham, Sir Geoffrey Leigh, Penelope Lively, Sir Andrew Motion, Cdr Michael Saunders Watson and Lord Steel of Aikwood. The Chairman of the Friends in 2013 was Ferdinand Mount, and Deputy Chairman was Graham Allatt.

== Acquisitions ==
The Friends principally fund acquisitions for the British Library's collections that it would not otherwise be able to fund from its own finances.

Such acquisitions have included author Graham Swift's archive, which included manuscripts, notes, revisions and proofs to all eight of his novels including the Booker Prize-winning Last Orders.

Funding has also included a contribution towards the £500,000 required in order to purchase the Ted Hughes archive, a former poet laureate, which included more than 220 files and boxes of manuscripts.

One acquisition was the Macclesfield Alphabet, a collection of 14 different types of alphabet that date from around 1500 AD. The Friends collaborated with the National Heritage Memorial Fund, The Art Fund, members of the British Library and several individual donors in order to enable the British Library to purchase the book.

=== Dering Roll ===
Those three charities had previously collaborated, along with Friends of the National Libraries, to purchase the Dering Roll in 2008. The Dering Roll is the oldest extant English roll of arms, dating from around 1270 AD. It depicts 324 coats of arms which are approximately a quarter of the entire English baronage during the reign of Edward I. It was purchased by the British Library at auction for £194,184 (including VAT).

=== Bust of King George III ===
In 1998 the Friends purchased Peter Turnerelli's 1812 marble bust of King George III to commemorate the move of the King's Library into the new facility at St. Pancras. The bust was purchased entirely by the Friends for the sum of £25,000. It is currently on public display on the first floor, at the head of the stairs at the main British Library facility in St. Pancras.

=== Mary Welch ===
The single largest contribution that the Friends have made towards the British Library was the grant of £130,000 towards a new conservation room as part of a bequest from Mary Welsh. She was a Friends volunteer and conservation enthusiast.

=== Mervyn Peake's archive ===
The Friends again collaborated with the British Library, The Art Fund, Friends of the National Libraries and individual donors to purchase Mervyn Peake's archive for a sum of £410,000. The archive included 39 Gormenghast notebooks, as well as the complete set of original drawings for the 1954 edition of Lewis Carroll's Alice Through the Looking-Glass and Alice's Adventures in Wonderland.

The archive itself dates from between 1940 and Peake's death in 1968 and includes unpublished material such as correspondence with writers Laurie Lee, Walter de la Mare and C. S. Lewis. It also included the unpublished draft of the sequel to the Gormenghast trilogy, Titus Awakes which was published in 2011 by Vintage Classics to celebrate the centenary of Peake's birth.

=== Merger ===
At their AGM on 19 March 2018, the Friends voted in favour of a proposal to merge with the Library's Membership scheme. This went into effect on 1 April 2018.

== See also ==
- The British Museum Friends
- British Library
