= Charlotte Brontë =

English novelist and poet (1816–1855)

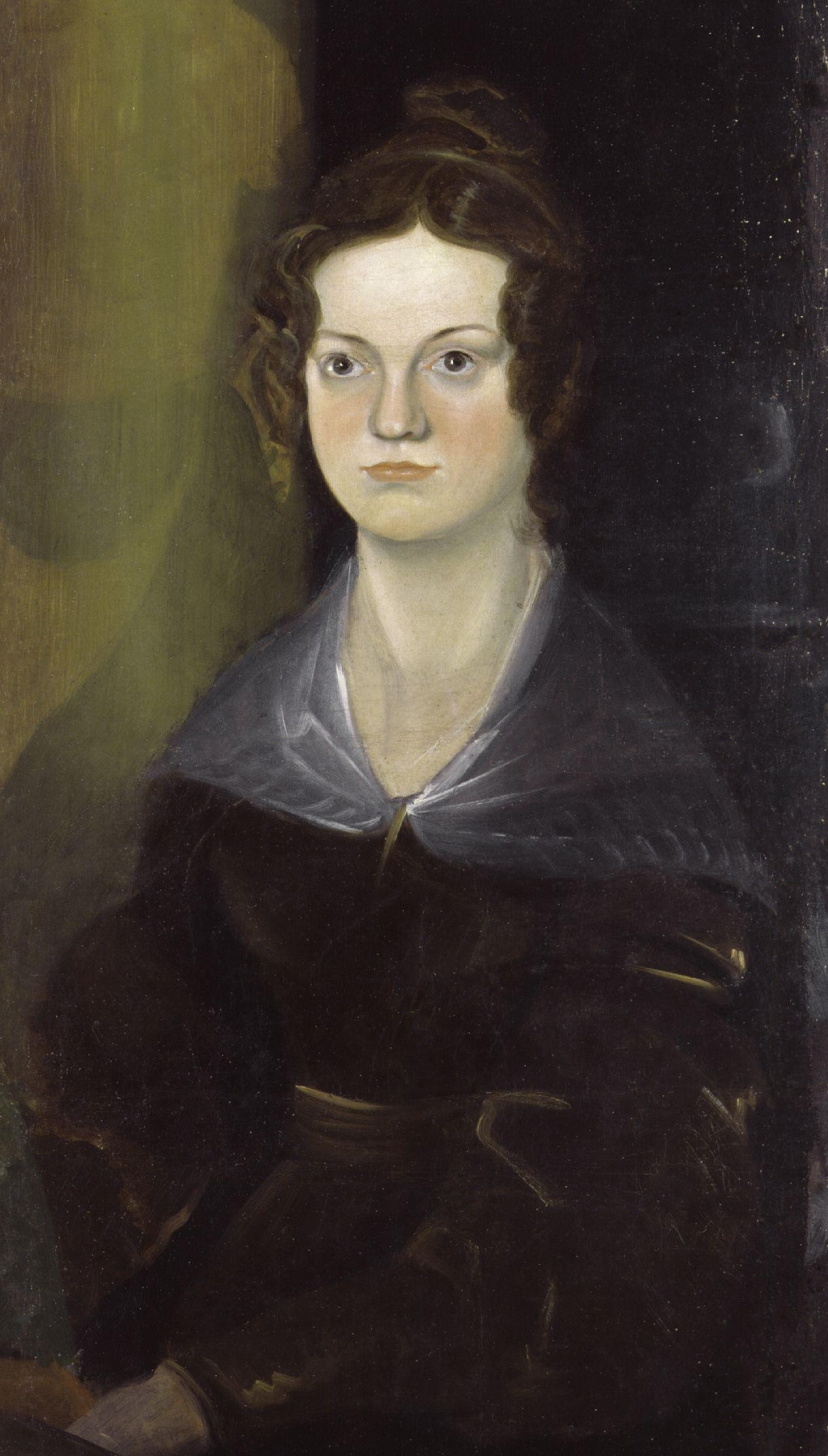
- Portrait c. 1834
- Born: 21 April 1816; Thornton, Yorkshire, England
- Died: 31 March 1855 (aged 38); Haworth, Yorkshire, England
- Resting place: St Michael and All Angels' Church, Haworth
- Occupations: Novelist, poet, governess
- Spouse: Arthur Bell Nicholls (m. 1854)
- Parents: Patrick Brontë; Maria Branwell
- Relatives: Brontë family
- Writing career
- Pen name: Lord Charles Albert Florian Wellesley; Currer Bell
- Genres: Fiction, poetry
- Notable works: Jane Eyre (1847); Shirley (1849); Villette (1853); The Professor (1857)
- Works related to Charlotte Brontë at Wikisource

Signature
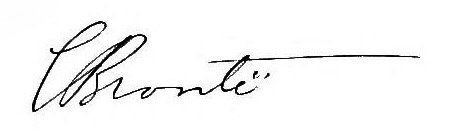

Charlotte Nicholls (21 April 1816 – 31 March 1855), commonly known by her maiden name Charlotte Brontë (/ˈʃɑːrlət ˈbrɒnti/, commonly /-teɪ/), was an English novelist and poet, and was the elder sister of Emily, Anne and Branwell Brontë. She is best known for her novel Jane Eyre, which was first published under the pseudonym Currer Bell. Jane Eyre was a great success on publication, and has since been acknowledged as a classic of English literature.

Charlotte was the third of six siblings born to Maria Branwell and Patrick Brontë. Maria died when Charlotte was only five years old, and three years later, Charlotte was sent to the Clergy Daughters' School at Cowan Bridge in Lancashire, along with her three sisters, Maria, Elizabeth and Emily. Conditions at the school were appalling, with frequent outbreaks of disease. Charlotte's two elder sisters fell ill there and died shortly afterwards; Charlotte attributed her own lifelong ill-health to her time at Cowan Bridge, and later used it as the model for Lowood School in Jane Eyre.

In 1831, Charlotte became a pupil at Roe Head School in Mirfield, but left the following year to teach her sisters, Emily and Anne, at home. In 1835, Charlotte returned to Roe Head as a teacher. In 1839, she accepted a job as governess to a local family, but left after a few months. In 1842, Charlotte joined the Heger Pensionnat, a girls' boarding school in Brussels, as a student, then later as a teacher, in the hope of acquiring the skills required to open a school of her own. However, she was obliged to leave after falling in love with the school's director, Constantin Heger, a married man, who inspired both the character of Rochester in Jane Eyre, and Charlotte's first novel, The Professor.

Charlotte, Emily and Anne attempted to open a school in Haworth, but failed to attract pupils. In 1846 the sisters published a collection of poems under the pseudonyms Currer, Ellis, and Acton Bell. Although Charlotte's first novel, The Professor, was rejected by publishers, her second novel, Jane Eyre, was published in 1847, attracting both praise and controversy. The sisters' true identities were revealed in 1848, and by the following year Charlotte was known in London literary circles. In 1854, Charlotte married Arthur Bell Nicholls, her father's curate. She became pregnant shortly after her wedding in June 1854, but died on 31 March 1855, possibly of tuberculosis, although there is evidence that she may have died from hyperemesis gravidarum, a complication of pregnancy.

== Early years and education ==
Charlotte Brontë was born on 21 April 1816, the third of six children born to Maria Branwell, the daughter of an affluent grocer and tea merchant from Cornwall, and Patrick Brontë (born Brunty) an Anglican curate. Patrick Brontë was one of ten children born to a poor Irish family, and, having shown both ambition and an aptitude for learning, had been educated in Latin and Greek by a local clergyman before earning a place at St John's College, Cambridge. Maria Branwell was from a more prosperous background, and her letters to Patrick remain the primary source of information about her. The couple were married at St Oswald's Church in Guiseley in December 1812. In 1815 Patrick took a new position in the Yorkshire village of Thornton, near Bradford, where Charlotte and her siblings were born.

=== Haworth ===
In 1820, Maria and Patrick moved with their six young children, Maria, Elizabeth, Charlotte, Branwell, Emily and Anne, to the village of Haworth, on the edge of the Yorkshire moors, where Patrick had been offered the position of perpetual curate of St Michael and All Angels Church. His salary was modest, but the post came with the use of a parsonage overlooking the churchyard and the moors. Patrick, as an Irish immigrant, struggled to be accepted in Haworth, and his children, who at first shared his Irish accent, also shared his lifelong sense of being an outsider. Living conditions in Haworth were poor, with high levels of early mortality and a water supply contaminated by runoff from the graveyard, as reported in 1850 in a damning health report by Benjamin Babbage. Historians have speculated that these factors may have contributed to the deaths of Charlotte and her siblings.

=== Death of Maria Branwell ===
Soon after arriving in Haworth, Maria Branwell fell ill with what may have been cancer. She died on 15 September 1821, after a long and painful illness, leaving her six children in the care of her sister, Elizabeth Branwell. Charlotte was then only five years old, and the loss of her mother affected her throughout her life. In 1850, she wrote to a friend:

It was strange now to peruse, for the first time, the records of a mind whence my own sprang ... and at once sad and sweet to find that mind of a truly fine, pure and elevated order ... There is a refinement, a modesty, a gentleness about them indescribable ... I wish that she had lived, and that I had known her.

=== Cowan Bridge ===
In August 1824, Patrick sent Maria, Elizabeth, Charlotte, and Emily to the Clergy Daughters' School at Cowan Bridge in Lancashire. The sisters were aged ten, nine, eight and five respectively, and had previously had no formal education. Charlotte's school report mentions that the eight-year old Charlotte "writes indifferently" and "knows nothing of grammar, geography, history, or accomplishments", although she is "altogether clever of her age".

Conditions at the school were harsh, with insanitary conditions, poor food and frequent outbreaks of disease, and in 1825, after an outbreak of typhus, Charlotte's two elder sisters both fell ill and subsequently died at home. Charlotte later maintained that conditions at the school had permanently affected her own health and physical development (she was of slight build and was less than 5 feet (1.5 m) tall, with very poor eyesight). After the deaths of Maria and Elizabeth, Patrick removed Charlotte and Emily from the school and arranged for them to be taught at home. Charlotte was greatly affected by the deaths of her older sisters, and later used Cowan Bridge as the model for Lowood School in Jane Eyre, which is similarly subject to outbreaks of tuberculosis and typhus exacerbated by the poor conditions. The headmaster of Cowan Bridge School, the Reverend William Carus Wilson, was represented by Charlotte in her portrait of Mr Brocklehurst, the headmaster of Lowood, a depiction that later prompted Carus Wilson to threaten to sue for libel.

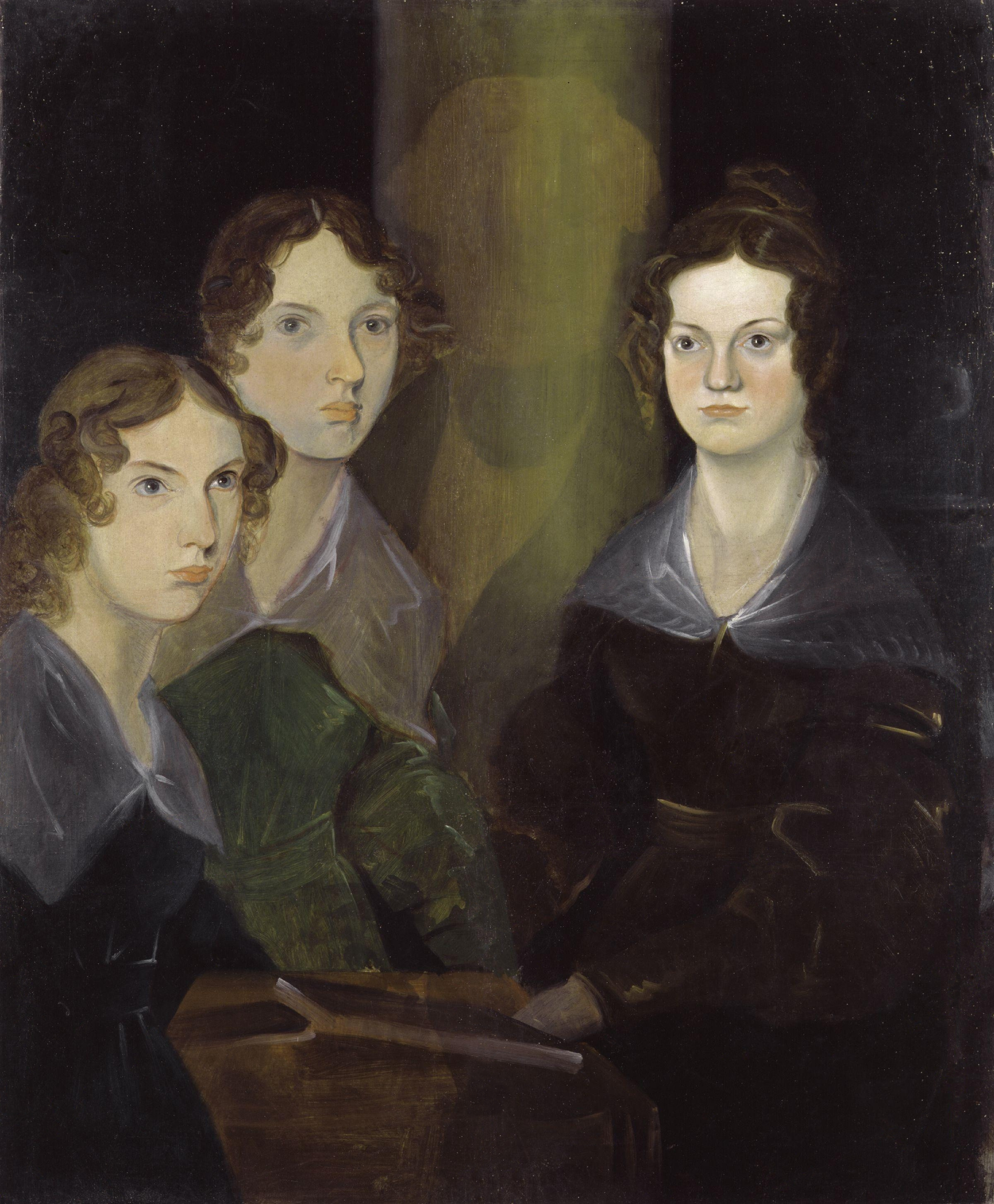
The Brontë sisters, painted by Branwell Brontë (in order: Anne, Emily and Charlotte)

=== Juvenilia ===
At home in Haworth Parsonage, the nine-year-old Charlotte now took over the care of her younger siblings under the supervision of their aunt Elizabeth Branwell. Patrick Brontë, though a difficult character in many ways, encouraged all his children to read widely, to take an interest in politics and current affairs and to enjoy music, art and poetry. He introduced them to the work of Byron, and allowed them to read the newspapers and periodicals to which he subscribed. Although girls were not allowed access to the village library, Branwell shared his books with his sisters. Favourites included John Milton's Paradise Lost, John Bunyan's Pilgrim's Progress, and Isaac Watts' Doctrine of the Passions. Charlotte also enjoyed the copies of the Lady's Magazine that had belonged to her mother, writing: "I shall never see anything which will interest me so much again", although Patrick later burnt them because "they contained foolish love stories."

The siblings, who had grown very close, often played together, creating imaginative 'plays' using their toys. One of the most influential of these 'plays' began in 1827, when Branwell received the gift of twelve wooden soldiers. These soldiers formed the basis of an ongoing fantasy role-playing game, featuring the 'Young Men', or 'The Twelves', which gradually came to dominate the lives of Charlotte and her siblings.

The ten-year-old Charlotte writes on 5 June 1826:

Papa bought Branwell some wooden soldiers at leeds when papa came home it was night and we were in Bed so next morning Branwell came to our Door with a Box of soldiers Emily and I jumped out of Bed, and I snat(c)hed up one and exclaimed this is the Duke of Wellington it shall be mine!! when I had said this Emily likewise took one up and said it should be hers when Anne came down she took one also. Mine was the prettiest of the whole, and the tallest, and the most perfect in every part Emily's was a grave-looking fellow, and we called him 'Gravey' Anne's was a queer little thing much like herself. he was called waiting boy Branwell chose Buonaparte.

The world in which these plays were set began as a series of islands off the coast of a fictionalised West Africa. Each child controlled one island, all of which had a capital named Glass Town: this eventually became the Glass Town Confederacy. A number of stories, little books and magazines were created by Charlotte and Branwell over this time to tie in with the Young Men's adventures. Charlotte and Branwell were the primary creators of this shared world and its juvenilia, but their younger siblings also contributed. Charlotte began writing poetry when she was thirteen in 1829. Many of these poems first appeared in a homemade magazine entitled Branwell's Blackwood's Magazine, which was linked to the Glass Town Confederacy. Charlotte, in private letters, called Glass Town her 'world below', a fantasy in which she could explore different lives and identities. Over the course of the project Charlotte showed her love for romantic settings, love affairs, and high society, while Branwell's contribution reflected his interest in battles and politics. From 1831 onwards, Emily and Anne withdrew from the Glass Town project to create a fictional land of their own called Gondal, while Charlotte and Branwell concentrated on an expanded version of the Glass Town Confederacy called Angria. Christine Alexander, a Brontë juvenilia historian, wrote:

...both Charlotte and Branwell ensured the consistency of their imaginary world. When Branwell exuberantly kills off important characters in his manuscripts, Charlotte comes to the rescue and, in effect, resurrects them for the next stories [...]; and when Branwell becomes bored with his inventions, such as the Glass Town magazine he edits, Charlotte takes over his initiative and keeps the publication going for several more years.

The sagas created by the siblings exist as partial manuscripts, some of which have been published. The siblings continued to create narratives around their imaginary lands throughout their childhood and adolescence, an interest that continued even into adulthood. In 1833 Charlotte wrote several novellas, including The Green Dwarf, under the name Wellesley, one of her Angrian heroes. From about 1833, her stories seemed to show less of an interest in the supernatural and a shift to more realistic subject matters.

=== Roe Head ===
In 1831, when she was fifteen, Charlotte was sent twenty miles away to Roe Head, a boarding school in Mirfield (now part of Hollybank Special School). There she became friends with two girls of her own age, Ellen Nussey and Mary Taylor. Mary was bright and outgoing, Ellen quieter and more reserved, but both girls became close to Charlotte, and continued to visit and correspond with her throughout her life. Both Mary and Ellen recalled Charlotte's old-fashioned clothing and Irish accent, while Ellen noted Charlotte's lack of appetite and reluctance to eat meat. Both mentioned that Charlotte's eyesight was very poor, which meant that she was unable to join in ball games or learn to play from sheet music, although her friends mentioned her love of drawing and poetry.

== Farewell to Angria ==
In 1832 Charlotte left Roe Head in order to teach her sisters at home in Haworth. In 1835, she returned to Roe Head as a teacher, remaining until 1838. Lonely and unhappy in her teaching post, Charlotte found an escape in writing poetry. Many of her poems were set in the imaginary world of Angria, often featuring Byronic heroes. Later, one of her ex-pupils was to describe Miss Brontë writing at her desk, in tiny letters, with her eyes shut; and Charlotte's writing from this period expresses her disgust for her "oafish" pupils and her desire to escape into fantasy. In December 1836, just before her twenty-first birthday, she wrote to the Poet Laureate, Robert Southey, asking for encouragement in her hoped-for career as a poet, and announcing her ambition to 'be forever known'. Southey wrote in response:

Literature cannot be the business of a woman's life, and it ought not to be. The more she is engaged in her proper duties, the less leisure will she have for it even as an accomplishment and a recreation.

Charlotte entered into a short correspondence with Southey, thanking him for his advice, but making clear her intention to pursue her writing.

In 1839, Charlotte received a proposal of marriage from Henry Nussey, the brother of her school friend Ellen Nussey. Charlotte declined, writing in a letter to Ellen:

I felt that though I esteemed Henry... I had not, and never could have that intense attachment which would make me willing to die for him—and if I ever marry it must be in that light of adoration that I will regard my Husband.

To Henry himself, she wrote:

I have no personal repugnance to the idea of a union with you—but I feel convinced that mine is not the sort of disposition calculated to form the happiness of a man like you ... You do not know me, I am not this serious, grave, cool-headed individual you suppose—You would think me romantic and eccentric—you would say I was satirical and severe. However, I scorn deceit and I will never for the sake of attaining the distinction of matrimony and escaping the stigma of an old maid take a worthy man whom I am conscious I cannot render happy.

At the end of 1839, Charlotte wrote Farewell to Angria, a manuscript in which she explored her growing dependency on her fantasy world. Fearing for her sanity, and with the sense that she was losing her grip on reality, she finally made the decision to set Angria aside for good. In this document, she speaks of the pain of leaving her 'friends' and venturing into 'lands unknown'.

Between 1839 and 1841, Charlotte sought employment as a governess to several local families. In 1839 she joined the Sidgwick family at Stone Gappe as governess to their son, John Benson Sidgwick. Charlotte was unhappy in her work, believing that her employers treated her as a servant, and were constantly humiliating her. According to Charlotte, John was an unruly child, who once threw a stone at her, an incident that may have inspired the section of Jane Eyre in which John Reed throws a book at Jane. The Sidgwicks confirmed this story, but stated that Charlotte was difficult to deal with, often took offence when none was intended, and 'often went to bed all day' leaving the heavily pregnant Mrs Sidgwick to look after the children. Charlotte left Stone Gappe to work as a governess to the White family, but although the Whites were 'well satisfied' by her work with their children, Charlotte found her menial position in the household difficult to cope with, and complains in letters to Ellen Nussey of her employers' 'vulgarity'.

== Brussels ==
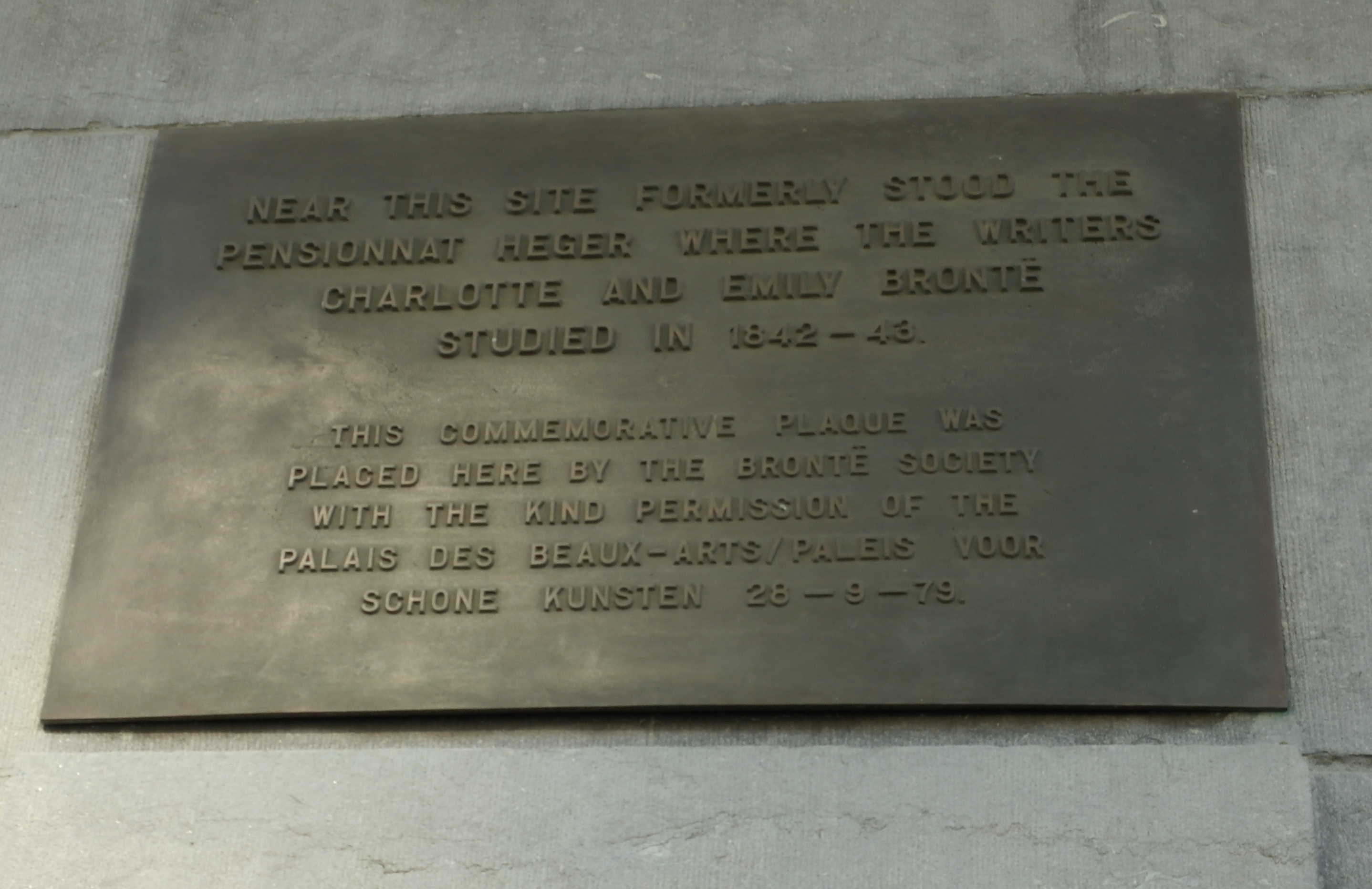
Plaque on the Centre for Fine Arts, Brussels

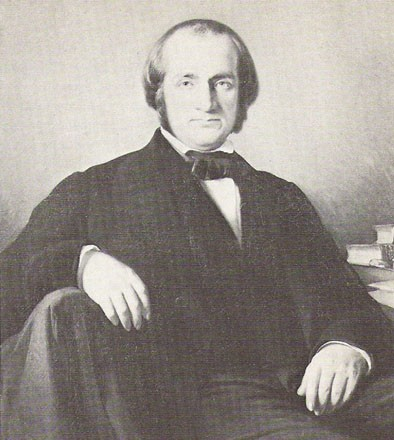
Constantin Heger in 1865

In 1842 Charlotte travelled with Emily to Brussels to the Pensionnat Heger, a boarding school run by Constantin Heger (1809–1896) and his wife, Claire. Both siblings were student teachers, with Charlotte teaching English and Emily eventually teaching music in return for board and lodging. In this way they hoped eventually to acquire the language skills they needed to open a school of their own. Charlotte initially liked and respected Madame Heger, and although she felt somewhat isolated from the other pupils at the Pensionnat, she developed a close relationship with her tutor, Constantin Heger, who became an important influence on her writing.

She writes:

There is one individual of whom I have not yet spoken M Heger the husband of Madame - he is a professor of Rhetoric a man of power as to mind but very choleric & irritable in temperament - a little, black, ugly being with a face that varies in expression, sometimes he borrows the lineaments of an insane Tomcat - sometimes those of a delirious Hyena - occasionally - but very seldom he discards these perilous attractions and assumes an air not above a hundred degrees removed from what you would call mild & gentleman-like ...

In October 1842 the sisters were called back to Haworth by the sudden death of their aunt Elizabeth Branwell. Charlotte's grief at the loss of her aunt was compounded by the deaths from cholera of two young friends of the family; William Weightman, who had been Patrick Brontë's curate, and Martha, the sister of Charlotte's friend Mary Taylor.

In January 1843, Charlotte returned to Brussels alone to take up a teaching post at the school. It was the first time she had travelled alone, and she found the experience alarming, later describing it in her novel Villette. However, in spite of her eagerness to return, Charlotte became increasingly homesick and lonely. Her initial liking for Madame Heger had changed to outright dislike, and she had grown passionately attached to the married Constantin Heger, making it difficult for her to remain. Charlotte returned to Haworth in January 1844, and later used her time in Brussels as the inspiration for some of the events in The Professor and Villette. Heger later attempted to destroy the letters sent to him by Charlotte, in which she expresses her deep feelings and her expectation to hear from him, but his wife retrieved and preserved them, although his own letters to Charlotte are missing.

After Charlotte's return to Haworth, the sisters attempted to open their own boarding school at the Parsonage. It was advertised as "The Misses Brontë's Establishment for the Board and Education of a limited number of Young Ladies" and inquiries were made to prospective pupils and sources of funding. But Charlotte had little enthusiasm for the project, and the remote location made it difficult to attract pupils. In October 1844 the project was abandoned.

== First publication ==
In May 1846, at Charlotte's insistence, the three sisters paid for the publication of a collection of their poems under the pseudonyms Currer, Ellis and Acton Bell. The sisters took names that corresponded with their initials: thus Charlotte was Currer Bell, Emily was Ellis, and Anne was Acton. Of this decision to conceal their identities, Charlotte wrote:

Averse to personal publicity, we veiled our own names under those of Currer, Ellis and Acton Bell; the ambiguous choice being dictated by a sort of conscientious scruple at assuming Christian names positively masculine, while we did not like to declare ourselves women, because – without at that time suspecting that our mode of writing and thinking was not what is called "feminine" – we had a vague impression that authoresses are liable to be looked on with prejudice; we had noticed how critics sometimes use for their chastisement the weapon of personality, and for their reward, a flattery, which is not true praise.

Only two copies of the collection of poems were sold, but Charlotte, though disappointed, sent copies of the book to a number of prominent writers, including William Wordsworth, Alfred Tennyson, and Thomas De Quincey. Although Emily and Anne continued to write poems, Charlotte did not, but prepared to submit a novel under her nom de plume.

== Jane Eyre ==
In 1846 Charlotte submitted her first novel, The Professor, to London publisher Henry Colburn, along with Emily's Wuthering Heights and Anne's Agnes Grey. In her accompanying letter she describes these as: "Three tales, each occupying a volume and capable of being published together or separately, as thought most advisable," and draws Colburn's attention to the fact that the authors have already been published elsewhere.

The Professor was not published, though the other two novels were accepted for publication on somewhat unfavourable terms. Charlotte submitted a second manuscript, Jane Eyre, to a different publisher, Smith, Elder & Co. in August 1847, and it was published soon afterwards.

The novel follows the life of a plain young woman, Jane, depicting her troubled childhood, her unhappy schooldays and her arrival in a new post as a governess to a young girl in a secluded mansion in Yorkshire. Jane falls in love with her employer, Mr Rochester, who is secretly hiding the fact that his first wife, a dangerous madwoman, is being kept in the attic. The book's style combined Romanticism, naturalism and gothic melodrama, but broke new ground with its first-person female perspective. Charlotte believed art was most convincing when based on personal experience; in Jane Eyre she transformed her experience into novel form.

Jane Eyre had immediate commercial success and initially received favourable reviews. G. H. Lewes wrote that it was "an utterance from the depths of a struggling, suffering, much-enduring spirit", and declared that it consisted of "suspiria de profundis!" (sighs from the depths). The subsequent publication of Wuthering Heights by Ellis Bell and Agnes Grey by Acton Bell, which had been delayed by the publisher, now caused further speculation about the identity of Currer Bell, including a change in the attitude of critics to Charlotte's work, as well as accusations that the writing was "coarse". This criticism was linked to the media's growing suspicion that Currer Bell was a woman. However, sales of Jane Eyre continued to grow. Charlotte executed the drawings for the second edition of Jane Eyre herself, and in the summer of 1834 two of her paintings were shown at an exhibition by the Royal Northern Society for the Encouragement of the Fine Arts in Leeds.

== Shirley ==
In 1848, Charlotte began her third novel, Shirley, but that year saw the deaths of all three of her remaining siblings within eight months of each other. In September, Branwell died of multiple conditions exacerbated by his heavy drinking. Emily died three months later of tuberculosis, and in May 1849, Anne died of the same illness. After the deaths of Emily and Anne, a family servant, Martha Brown, recalled how the sisters had used to walk round the dining-room table in the Parsonage, discussing their writings, and spoke of her sadness "to hear Miss Brontë walking, walking on alone".

After Anne's death Charlotte resumed writing as a way of dealing with her grief, and Shirley, which deals with themes of industrial unrest and the role of women in society, was published in October 1849. The novel's reception was not as enthusiastic as that of Jane Eyre; a reviewer in The Times described it as: 'at once the most high-flown and the stalest of fictions.' Charlotte, as her late sisters' executor, edited and wrote an explanatory introduction to Wuthering Heights in order to make it less shocking to the public. She also suppressed the republication of Anne's second novel, The Tenant of Wildfell Hall, which had been published, to great success, the previous year. This decision had a lasting negative effect on Anne's popularity as a novelist and has remained controversial among the sisters' biographers ever since.

== In society ==
Although Emily and Anne were both opposed to their real identities being known, Charlotte discreetly revealed herself to her publisher and friends as the author of Jane Eyre. This led Charlotte to make occasional visits to London, where she began to move in more exalted social circles, becoming friends with Elizabeth Gaskell and Harriet Martineau whose sister Rachel had taught Gaskell's daughters. Charlotte sent an early copy of Shirley to Martineau whose home at Ambleside she visited. The two friends shared an interest in racial relations and the abolitionist movement; recurrent themes in their writings. Charlotte was also acquainted with William Makepeace Thackeray and G. H. Lewes. In spite of this, she never left Haworth for more than a few weeks at a time, and surprised the London literary world by her lack of social brilliance. Thackeray's daughter, writer Anne Isabella Thackeray Ritchie, recalled a visit to her father by Charlotte:

... two gentlemen come in, leading a tiny, delicate, serious, little lady, with fair straight hair and steady eyes. She may be a little over thirty; she is dressed in a little barège dress with a pattern of faint green moss. She enters in mittens, in silence, in seriousness; our hearts are beating with wild excitement. This then is the authoress, the unknown power whose books have set all London talking, reading, speculating; some people even say our father wrote the books – the wonderful books. ... The moment is so breathless that dinner comes as a relief to the solemnity of the occasion, and we all smile as my father stoops to offer his arm; for, genius though she may be, Miss Brontë can barely reach his elbow. My own personal impressions are that she is somewhat grave and stern, specially to forward little girls who wish to chatter. ... Everyone waited for the brilliant conversation which never began at all. Miss Brontë retired to the sofa in the study, and murmured a low word now and then to our kind governess ... the conversation grew dimmer and more dim, the ladies sat round still expectant, my father was too much perturbed by the gloom and the silence to be able to cope with it at all ... after Miss Brontë had left, I was surprised to see my father opening the front door with his hat on. He put his fingers to his lips, walked out into the darkness, and shut the door quietly behind him ... long afterwards ... Mrs Procter asked me if I knew what had happened. ... It was one of the dullest evenings [Mrs Procter] had ever spent in her life ... the ladies who had all come expecting so much delightful conversation, and the gloom and the constraint, and how finally, overwhelmed by the situation, my father had quietly left the room, left the house, and gone off to his club.

== Villette ==
The last of Charlotte's novels to be published in her lifetime was Villette, which appeared in 1853. Its main themes include isolation, how such a condition can be borne, and the internal conflict brought about by social repression of individual desire. Its main character, Lucy Snowe, travels abroad to teach in a boarding school in the fictional town of Villette, where she encounters a culture and religion different from her own and falls in love with a man (Paul Emanuel) whom she cannot marry. Her experiences result in a breakdown but eventually, she achieves independence and fulfilment through running her own school. A substantial amount of the novel's dialogue is in the French language. Villette marked Charlotte's return to writing from a first-person perspective, a technique she had used in Jane Eyre. Another similarity to Jane Eyre lies in the use of her personal experience as inspiration for fictional events, in particular the time she spent at the pensionnat in Brussels. Villette was acknowledged by critics of the day as a potent and sophisticated piece of writing, although it was criticised for its "coarseness" and for not being suitably "feminine" in its portrayal of Lucy's desires.

== Marriage ==
Shortly before the publication of Villette, Charlotte received a proposal of marriage from the Reverend Arthur Bell Nicholls, an Irishman from County Antrim in her father's native Ulster, who had been educated in County Offaly. Nicholls had been her father's curate, and had long been in love with Charlotte. She initially refused him, and her father objected to the union at least partly because of Nicholls's poor financial status. Elizabeth Gaskell, who believed that marriage provided "clear and defined duties" that were beneficial for a woman, encouraged Charlotte to consider the positive aspects of such a union and tried to use her contacts to engineer an improvement in Nicholls's finances.

Charlotte, meanwhile, was increasingly attracted to Nicholls and by January 1854, she had accepted his proposal. They gained the approval of her father by April and married on 29 June. Patrick Brontë had intended to give Charlotte away, but at the last minute decided he could not, and Charlotte had to make her way to the church without him. Because her father did not attend, it was Miss Wooler (Charlotte's former teacher at Roe Head School, and life-long friend) who gave her away. The married couple took their honeymoon in Banagher, County Offaly, Ireland. By all accounts, her marriage was a success and Charlotte found herself very happy in a way that was new to her.

== Death ==
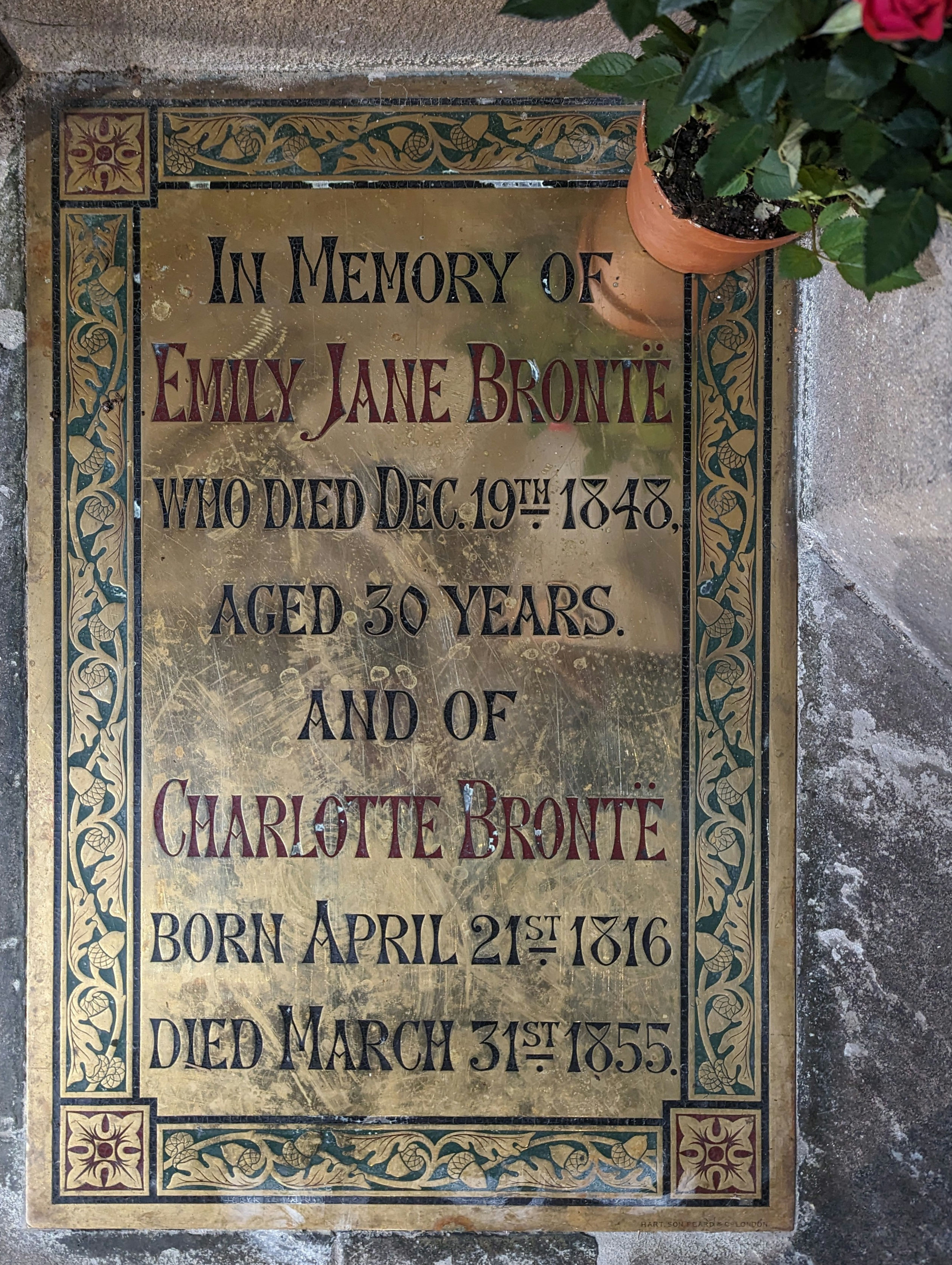
Brass plaque on family vault of Charlotte Brontë and Emily Brontë at St Michael and All Angels' Church, Haworth

Charlotte became pregnant soon after her wedding, but her health declined rapidly and, according to Gaskell, she was subject to "sensations of perpetual nausea and ever-recurring faintness". She died, along with her unborn child, on 31 March 1855, three weeks before her 39th birthday. Her death certificate gives the cause of death as phthisis, but biographer Claire Harman, among others, suggests that she died from complications caused by severe morning sickness or hyperemesis gravidarum. She was buried in the family vault in the Church of St Michael and All Angels at Haworth.

The Professor, Charlotte's first novel, was published posthumously in 1857. The fragment of a new novel she had been writing in her last years has been twice completed by recent authors, the more famous version being Emma Brown: A Novel from the Unfinished Manuscript by Charlotte Brontë by Clare Boylan in 2003. Most of her writings about the imaginary country of Angria have also been published since her death.

== Personality and character ==
Charlotte's character is largely known through private letters to her family, friends and publisher, as well as from Elizabeth Gaskell's biography The Life of Charlotte Brontë, which was begun during her lifetime. Gaskell described her first meeting with Charlotte in a letter, writing:

She is underdeveloped, thin and more than half a head shorter than I ... [with] a reddish face, large mouth and many teeth gone; altogether plain.

Later, Gaskell portrays her in a less unflattering way, but emphasizes her physical frailty. In a letter to her publisher, Charlotte complains of Gaskell's tendency to depict her as weak and helpless, writing: "She seems determined that I shall be a sort of invalid. Why may I not be well like other people?" It has been argued that Gaskell's approach transferred the focus of attention away from the Brontë sisters' "difficult" novels and began a process of sanctification of their private lives.

=== The Life of Charlotte Brontë ===
Elizabeth Gaskell's biography was published in 1857, and, though it omits certain details, remains a primary source of information about Charlotte and her family. It was an important step for a leading female novelist to write a biography of another, and Gaskell's approach was unusual in that, rather than analysing her subject's achievements, she concentrated on private details of Charlotte's life, sanitising those aspects that might have justified the accusations of "coarseness" levelled at her writing. The biography is frank in places, but omits details of Charlotte's love for Constantin Heger as being too much of an affront to contemporary morals and a likely source of distress to Charlotte's father, widower, and friends. Gaskell also provided a large amount of anecdotal (and possibly inaccurate) information about Patrick Brontë and other members of the family, to which Patrick heartily objected.

=== Religion ===
The daughter of an Irish Anglican clergyman, Charlotte was herself an Anglican. In a letter to her publisher, she claims to "love the Church of England. Her Ministers indeed, I do not regard as infallible personages, I have seen too much of them for that – but to the Establishment, with all her faults – the profane Athanasian Creed excluded – I am sincerely attached." In spite of this, she attended a service in a Catholic church during her final year in Brussels, and took confession from the priest. She writes about this in a letter to Emily, asking her not to tell their father of the incident, and it appears later as an episode in Villette.

=== Letters ===
Charlotte was the most prolific letter-writer of the Brontë siblings, and her correspondence forms the backbone of her biographies. Most of her surviving letters are to her old school friend Ellen Nussey, although her letters to her other school friend Mary Taylor, to whom she confided her imaginary world and literary ambitions, were destroyed. Charlotte frequently used letter-writing as a means of experimenting with different identities and styles, as with Currer Bell, and although she is often intimate, even uninhibited in her letter-writing, she also uses this technique as a means of hiding aspects of her true personality. The biographer Lucasta Miller describes her as a 'self-mythologiser', perpetuating both 'the positive myth of female self-creation embodied by her autobiographical heroines' and that of the 'quiet and trembling creature, reared in total seclusion, a martyr to duty and a model of Victorian femininity,' neither of which are entirely representative.

=== Nussey letters ===
About 350 of roughly 500 letters sent by Charlotte to Ellen Nussey survive, whereas all of Ellen's letters to Charlotte were burned at Nicholls's request. After their marriage, Nicholls not only asked Charlotte to burn Ellen's letters after reading them, but censored some of Charlotte's letters to her friend before allowing them to be sent. The surviving letters, preserved by Ellen in defiance of Nicholls' wishes, provide most of the information available on Charlotte Brontë's daily life, feelings and relationships. Their tone is intimate, confiding and have even been interpreted by some to have romantic undertones. Charlotte writes on one occasion:

What shall I do without you? How long are we likely to be separated? Why are we to be denied each other's society ... I long to be with you. Why are we to be divided? Surely, Ellen, it must be because we are in danger of loving each other too well ...

=== Heger letters ===
On 29 July 1913 The Times of London printed four letters from Charlotte to Constantin Heger, written after her departure from Brussels in 1844. Written in French except for one postscript in English, the letters challenged the prevailing image of Charlotte as an angelic martyr to Christian and female duties that had been constructed by many biographers, beginning with Gaskell. These letters, which formed part of a larger and somewhat one-sided correspondence to which Heger frequently appears not to have replied, seem to reveal her love for a married man, although the letters have also been interpreted in other ways, including as an example of literary self-dramatisation and an expression of gratitude from a former pupil. In January 1845, she writes:

...all I know – is that I cannot – that I will not resign myself to the total loss of my master's friendship – I would rather undergo the greatest bodily pains that have my heart constantly lacerated by searing regrets. If my master withdraws his friendship from me entirely I shall be absolutely without hope – if he gives me a little friendship – a very little – I shall be content – happy, I would have a motive for living – for working. Monsieur, the poor do not need a great deal to live on – they ask only the crumbs of bread which fall from the rich men's table – but if they are refused these crumbs – they die of hunger – No more do I need a great deal of affection from those I love – I would not know what to do with a whole and complete friendship – I am not accustomed to it – but you showed a little interest in me in days gone by when I was your pupil in Brussels – and I cling to the preservation of this little interest – I cling to it as I would cling on to life.

=== Letters to George Smith ===
Charlotte later also engaged in frequent correspondence with her editor, George Smith. The often flirtatious tone of these letters has been remarked upon by historians as a possible sign that Charlotte was in love with him, and her letter to him on hearing of his impending marriage to another has been interpreted as a sign of her despair:

My dear Sir

In great happiness, as in great grief—words of sympathy should be few. Accept my meed of congratulation—and believe me

Sincerely yours,

C. Brontë

— Juliet Barker, The Brontes: A Life in Letters

== Legacy ==
A number of authors have cited Charlotte Brontë as an influence, including Kazuo Ishiguro, who, when asked to name his favourite novelist, answered "Charlotte Brontë's recently edged out Dostoevsky...I owe my career, and a lot else besides, to Jane Eyre and Villette."

Daphne du Maurier's 1938 novel Rebecca is strongly influenced by Jane Eyre; Jean Rhys wrote the story of the first Mrs Rochester in Wide Sargasso Sea (1966). Other novels inspired by Charlotte Brontë's work include: Jane Steele, by Lyndsay Faye; The Brontë Cabinet: Three Lives in Nine Objects, by Deborah Lutz; The Eyre Affair, by Jasper Fforde; The Madwoman Upstairs by Catherine Lowell; and Reader, I Married Him, a collection of short stories edited by Tracy Chevalier.

The town of Bronte, Texas, is named for Charlotte Brontë (though the town's name is pronounced "brahnt").

In 1980 a commemorative plaque was unveiled at the Centre for Fine Arts, Brussels, on the site of Madame Heger's school, in honour of Charlotte and Emily.

== Media portrayals ==
- In the 1946 Curtis Bernhardt film Devotion, a fictionalized biography of the Brontë sisters, Olivia de Havilland plays Charlotte.
- In the 1973 Yorkshire Television series The Brontës of Haworth, written by Christopher Fry, Charlotte is played by Vickery Turner.
- In the 1979 André Téchiné film The Brontë Sisters, Charlotte is played by Marie-France Pisier.
- In the 2016 BBC One television film To Walk Invisible, Charlotte is played by Finn Atkins.
- In the 2022 Frances O'Connor film Emily, about Emily Brontë, Alexandra Dowling plays Charlotte.

== Works ==
=== Juvenilia ===
- The Young Men's Magazine, Volumes 1–3 (August 1830)
- A Book of Ryhmes (1829)
- The Spell
- The Secret
- Lily Hart
- The Foundling
- Albion and Marina
- Tales of the Islanders
- The Green Dwarf
- Tales of Angria (written 1838–1839 – a collection of childhood and young adult writings including five short novels)
  - Mina Laury
  - Stancliffe's Hotel
  - The Duke of Zamorna
  - Henry Hastings (Note: Charlotte wrote this piece, however, Branwell also used the name Henry Hastings as a pseudonym in their juvenilia.)
  - Caroline Vernon
  - The Roe Head Journal Fragments
  - Farewell to Angria

=== Novels ===
- Jane Eyre, published in 1847
- Shirley, published in 1849
- Villette, published in 1853
- The Professor, published posthumously in 1857
- Emma, unfinished; Brontë wrote only 20 pages of the manuscript, published posthumously in 1860. In recent decades, at least two continuations of this fragment have appeared:
  - Emma, by "Charlotte Brontë and Another Lady", published 1980; although this has been attributed to Elizabeth Goudge, the actual author was Constance Savery.
  - Emma Brown, by Clare Boylan, published 2003

=== Poetry ===
- Bell, Currer; Bell, Ellis; Bell, Acton (1846). Poems.
