= Clare Boylan =

Irish author, critic and journalist (1948–2006)

- Born: 21 April 1948; Dublin, Ireland
- Died: 16 May 2006 (aged 58); Dublin, Ireland
- Occupations: Author, journalist
- Spouse: Alan Wilkes
- Writing career
- Language: English
- Notable awards: Spirit of Life Award; Benson & Hedges Journalist of the Year 1974

Clare Boylan (21 April 1948 – 16 May 2006) was an Irish author, journalist and critic for newspapers, magazines and many international broadcast media.

== Life and career ==
Born in Dublin, Ireland, on 21 April 1948, to Patrick and Evelyn Boylan (née Selby), Boylan began her career as a journalist at the now defunct Irish Press. In 1974, she won the Journalist of the Year award when working in the city for the Evening Press.There she met her husband, fellow journalist Alan Wilkes. From 1981, Boylan edited the glossy magazine Image, before largely giving up journalism to focus on a career as an author in 1984.

Her novels are Holy Pictures (1983), Last Resorts (1984), Black Baby (1988), Home Rule (1992), Beloved Stranger (1999), Room for a Single Lady (1997) – which won the Spirit of Light Award and was optioned for a film – and Emma Brown (2003). The latter work is a continuation of a 20-page fragment written by Charlotte Brontë before her death.

Boylan's short stories are collected in A Nail on the Head (1983), Concerning Virgins (1990) and That Bad Woman (1995). The film Making Waves, based on her short story "Some Ladies on a Tour", was nominated for an Oscar in 1988.

Her non-fiction includes The Agony and the Ego (1994) and The Literary Companion to Cats (1994). She wrote introductions to the novels of Kate O'Brien and Molly Keane and adapted Molly Keane's novel Good Behaviour as the classic serial for BBC Radio 4 (2004). Boylan's work has been translated as far afield as Russia and Hong Kong.

Many of her writings were inspired by feminist thinking. She said of this theme that "by definition, I am a woman writer because the things that interest me are the things that are most interesting to women". Her works gained her membership to Aosdána.

In later life, she lived in County Wicklow with her husband Alan Wilkes. She died in Dublin after a lengthy struggle with ovarian cancer, aged 58, on 16 May 2006.
