= Hollybank Trust =

English registered charity and care home

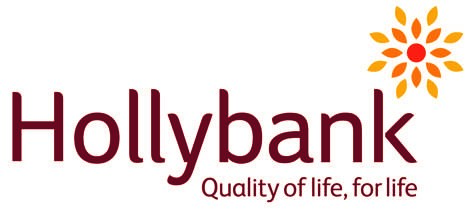
- Founded: 1954
- Registration no.: 1043129
- Location: Mirfield, England
- Coordinates: 53°40′48.4392″N 1°41′48.1668″W
- Region served: England, Yorkshire
- Product: Education and residential care for children, young people and adults with profound and multiple disabilities
- Key people: Anna O'Mahony (Chief Executive); Ailsa Moore (Head Teacher)
- Website: hollybanktrust.com

Hollybank Trust is a registered charity and care home, specialising in caring for children with multiple and profound disabilities. Hollybank school was one of the first registered schools for disabled children to be built in the North of England. It employs over 500 full and part-time staff at locations across Yorkshire, in Mirfield, Halifax, Holmfirth, Barnsley and South Kirkby.

== History ==
Hollybank began in 1954 in Lindley, a suburb of Huddersfield in Yorkshire. According to local speculation an elderly lady helped disabled children because she herself had lived in a family with disabled sisters whom became subject to the Mental Health Act. The sisters were allegedly sectioned for mental health when they should have been looked after for disablement. This was the motivation for opening Hollybank school, and with financial assistance from the Smith Homes Trust, was the first school for disabled children built in the North of England. Other schools followed in Harrogate and Leeds.

In 1990, the school re-located to Roe Head in Mirfield, Yorkshire, a town situated between Huddersfield and Dewsbury and it became a registered charity in its own right (Hollybank Trust) in 1994.

Part of the Hollybank Trust, has connections with the Brontë family. The Roe Head property in Mirfield which the Hollybank Trust acquired in 1990 was a former Victorian boarding school for girls. In 1831, Charlotte Brontë was enrolled at the Roe Head school of Miss Wooler, and subsequently went on to be Wooler's assistant three years later. All three Brontë sisters were educated at Roe Head School between 1831 and 1838. Appropriately the location is still used as a school to this day, albeit one for special requirements.

Local Paralympian athlete Paul Cartwright, is ambassador for the Hollybank School, which he attended as a boy. Cartwright represented Great Britain at the 1984 Stoke Mandeville Paralympic Games in 100m, 200m, 400m sprint, and the marathon.

== Activities ==
Hollybank Special School in Mirfield provides specialised education, therapy and care for children from 5 to 19 years of age. The trust also has a children's home and adult residential homes both in the community and at its main site. All children and young people attending Hollybank have physical disabilities and additional complex needs. Hollybank specialise in supporting physical disabilities, learning disabilities, sensory disabilities, . There are residential and non-residential facilities. Staff include qualified therapists and nurses.

Hollybank ran a video campaign in 2012 to leverage support via social media, drawing attention to their work – the campaign was called Give it up for Hollybank. They also organised a charity sky diving event in April 2013 for a number of disabled children. For more than 10 years the Hollybank Trust has been sending groups during the summer and spring seasons to Otley Sailing Club in the parish of Leeds to learn and experience all the benefits of sailing. The BBC produced a 'Get Inspired' video in December 2015, which featured an Otley Club dinghy used by Holly Bank Trust and sponsored by a Preston based business Freightlink.co.uk. Freightlink also help Hollybank organise and fund the Otley Club sailing days. In January 2014, a group of 15 ambassadors from the local community worked with staff from the UK office of Chiquita Brands International to take on a series of fundraising challenges.

== Awards ==
- 2006 – ICT Excellence Awards
- 2008 – Skills for Care – Accolades
- 2013 – Lloyd's Bank Community funding Award.

== See also ==
- Developmentally disabled
- Special education in the United Kingdom
- Special Educational Needs and Disability Act 2001
- The Children's Society
- Timeline of young people's rights in the United Kingdom
