= Emma Brown =

Incomplete manuscript of Charlotte Brontë

Emma
- Cover of Emma Brown
- Author: Clare Boylan, Charlotte Brontë
- Language: English
- Publisher: Little, Brown
- Publication date: 2003
- ISBN: 0-316-72611-7

Emma is the title of a manuscript by Charlotte Brontë, left incomplete when she died in 1855.

A pastiche of it was written by Clare Boylan and published as Emma Brown in 2003.

== Original manuscript ==
Brontë began work on Emma in 1853. Her marriage in 1854 and the indifference of her husband for the project may have contributed to her slow progress towards completion. The manuscript remained unfinished upon her death in 1855.

The original twenty-page manuscript consists of two chapters describing the arrival of an apparently rich young girl, "Matilda Fitzgibbon", at an expensive private school. It transpires that her identity is fake, and her school fees will not be paid. The child is unable to answer any questions as to her true identity.

== Savery's completion ==
Constance Savery published a completion in 1980.

== Boylan's completion ==
Clare Boyan's Emma: A Novel from the Unfinished Manuscript by Charlotte Brontë was published in 2003. Boylan "steeped herself in letters and writings" and acknowledged the assistance of several notable Brontë scholars in her afterword to the novel. Boylan developed the story as a mystery novel, using two characters from Brontë's original chapters who work together to solve the puzzle of the eponymous girl's identity: Mrs. Chalfont, a widow introduced as a narrator in the manuscript, and Mr. Ellin, a lawyer who accepts the challenge the girl represents.

== Reception ==
Boylan's version was favourably reviewed, but was not regarded as a faithful continuation of the style and voice of Brontë. Boylan's Telegraph obituary concluded she "conveyed little of the deep moral and theological framework that underpinned Charlotte Brontë's writing."
