= The Young Men's Magazine =

The Young Men's Magazine is the last of a series of three magazines written by Branwell Brontë and his sister Charlotte. The journals were handwritten mini-books containing articles, stories, letters, and reviews, inspired by and following the model of Blackwood's Magazine and Fraser's Magazine. A notable issue is volume 2, a copy of which was sold in December 2011 for £690,850 at Sotheby's in London. Writing the magazine on the basis of established literary models helped Charlotte and Branwell in their maturation process toward becoming "literary professionals".

== History ==
The Brontë siblings began writing prose and poetry related to their paracosmic fantasy world in the 1820s, and in December 1827 produced a novel, Glass Town. In January 1829 Branwell started publishing a monthly miscellany involving events and characters from that world, Branwell's Blackwood's Magazine, the title taken from the well-known magazine Blackwood's Magazine, and its content inspired by Blackwood's and Fraser's Magazine. Branwell published it for six months. Its name changed to Blackwood's Young Men's Magazine when Charlotte took it over in 1829; six volumes were published over the next six months. She resurrected it in August 1830 as The Young Men's Magazine. The Young Men were characters based on the original twelve wooden soldiers bought by Rev. Brontë for Branwell in 1826. The books were supposed to have been produced and read by the soldiers, thus their miniature size.

What the magazine borrowed especially from Blackwood's was its alternating between serious and satirical points of view, a dynamic Charlotte apparently found very attractive—she wrote, for instance, a series of contributions for two opposite frequent contributors to her magazine, "the sentimental Marquis of Douro and the sardonic Lord Charles Wellesley", sons of the Duke of Wellington, both of whom also figure in the plays she writes. Wellesley, Douro, and others wrote in correspondence columns; the magazine also featured advertisements; in one of those Lord Charles Wellesley challenges a man who insulted him in a tavern "to try a match at fisty-cuffs."

The prose fiction and drama is set in what has been called "Glass Town Saga", the fictional world set in West Africa, prompted by the gift of twelve little wooden soldiers to Branwell by his father. Stories related to these characters made their way into hundreds of little books, including, in 1829, the magazine. The authors' names were likewise fantastical or imaginative, often related to wood: Branwell signs as "Sergeant Bud," and under Charlotte's editorship contributions are signed "WT" ("we two") or "UT" ("us two"). Charlotte as editor assumes the name "Captain Tree".

== Existing versions and facsimiles ==
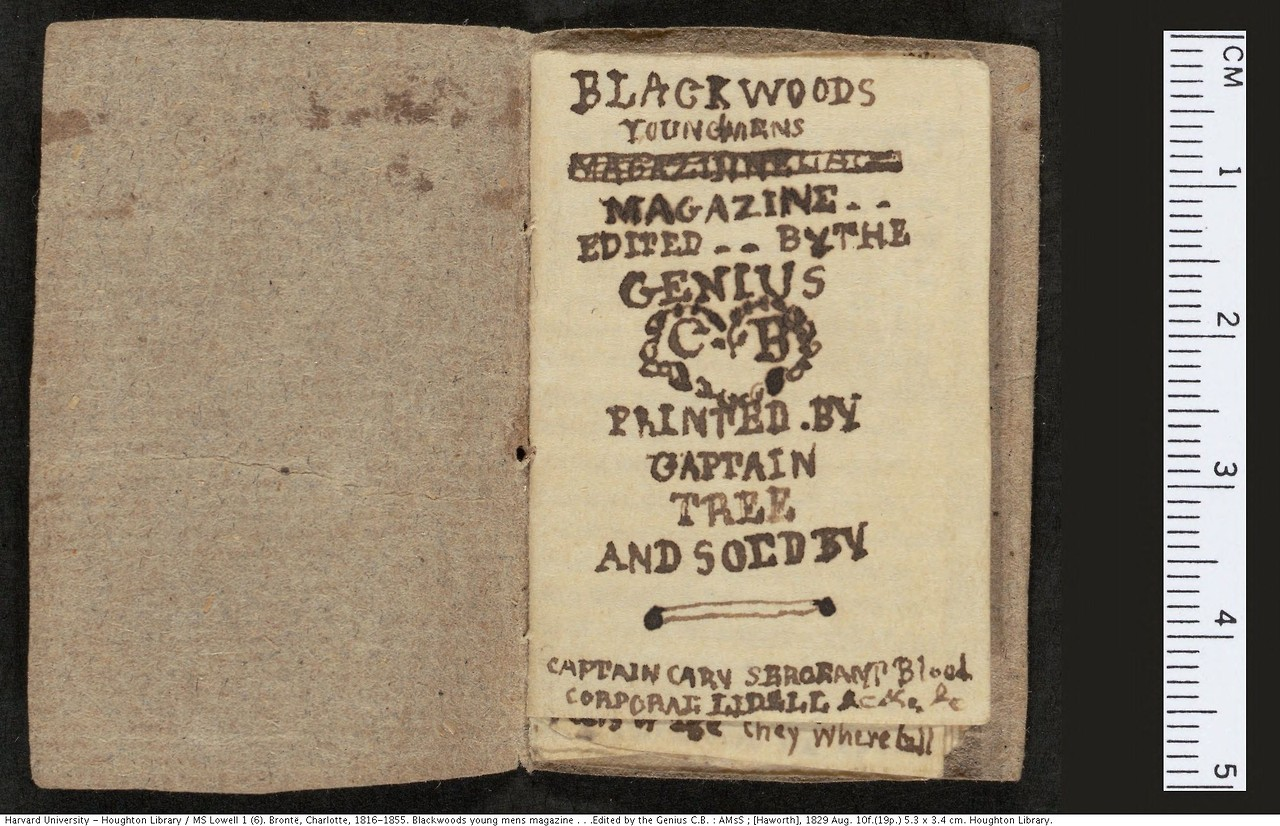
Blackwoods Young Men's Magazine (August 1829) by Charlotte Brontë is part of the Houghton Library's collection.

A partial facsimile of what is described as "the fifth Number of the Second Series" is in the Brontë Parsonage Museum. A set of nine issues was offered for sale by Bernard Quaritch; it contained six issues written by Charlotte (who signed her name as "the Genius C.B.") and three by Branwell.

== Description and contents of volume 2 ==
The 14-year-old Charlotte Brontë produced six copies of The Young Men's Magazine, Volume 2. Four of them are in possession of the Brontë Parsonage Museum, and one was owned by a private collector; the location of the sixth is unknown. The copy presented for auction in 2011 was estimated to fetch between £200,000 and £300,000, but a bidding war ensued, won by the Paris Musée des Lettres et Manuscrits with a final bid of £690,850, more than any Brontë manuscript has ever fetched at auction.

In November 2019, the Brönte Society was able to purchase the final fifth book in a Paris auction for €600,000 (£512,970.) The museum was able to purchase this book with the help of a robust fundraising campaign which was supported by such celebrities as Dame Judi Dench, president of the Brönte Society.

The book has 19 hand-written pages, measuring 35 mm × 61 mm (1.4 in × 2.4 in), and containing over 4,000 words. It is set in "the earliest fictional world created by the Bronte siblings", Glass Town. The story is a precursor to an episode found much later, in Jane Eyre, "the famous passage ... in which Mr Rochester's insane wife, who is kept in the attic, seeks revenge by setting fire to his bed curtains".
