= Chris Wright (programmer) =

Linux kernel hacker

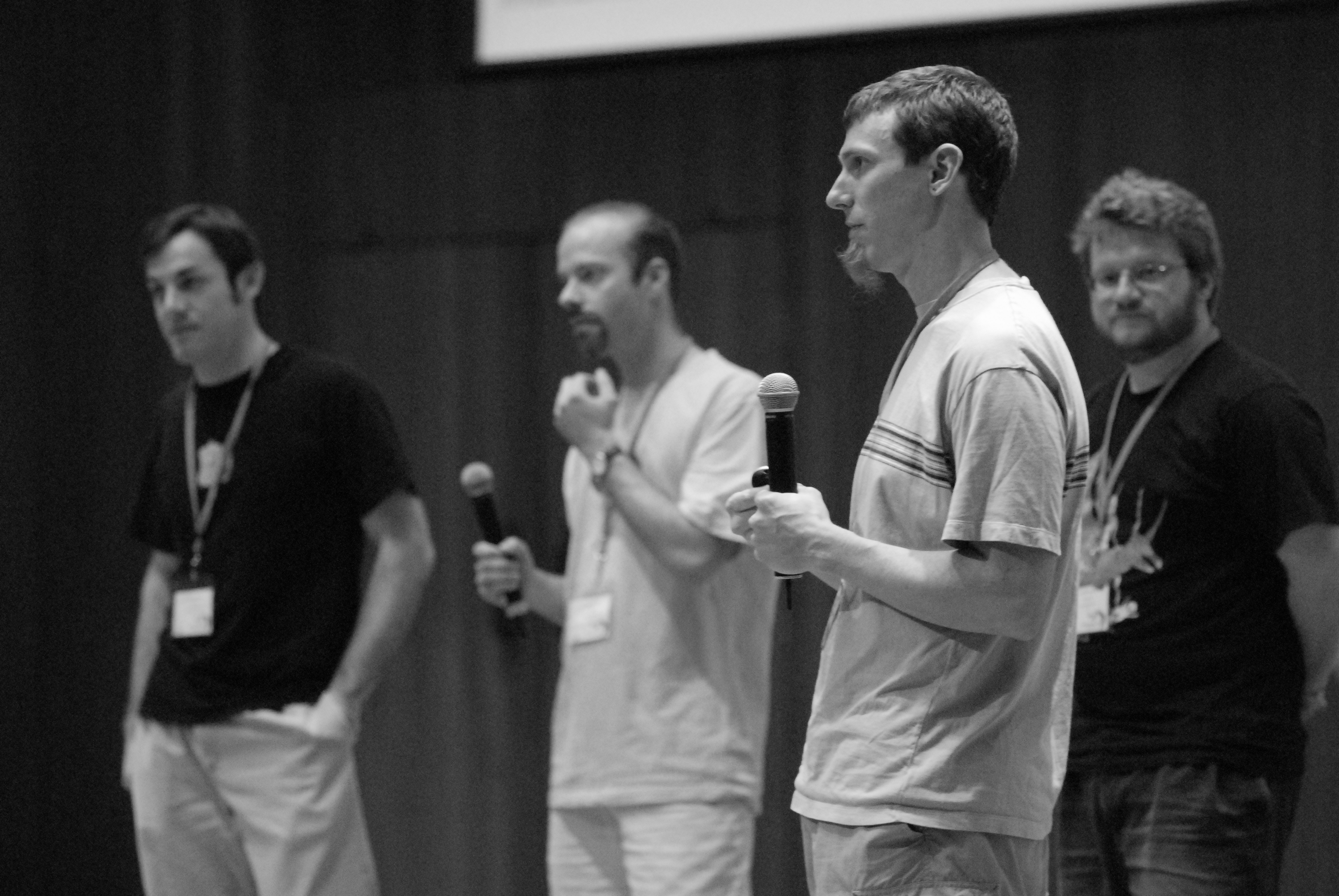
- Photo of Wright (foreground)
- Occupation: Programmer
- Employer: Red Hat

Chris Wright is a Linux kernel developer and CTO with Red Hat. He was the Linux kernel co-maintainer for the -stable branch with Greg Kroah-Hartman. He is involved in Linux kernel security related topics and is currently the maintainer for the LSM framework.

Wright also serves as the Chair of the OpenDaylight Project Board of Directors.

Wright is vice president and chief technology officer (CTO) at Red Hat.
