= Chris Wright (anthropologist) =

British visual anthropologist

Chris Wright is a visual anthropologist as of 2023 holding the position of lecturer at Goldsmiths College, and professor at the Free University of Berlin. Wright originally trained as an artist before becoming Photographic Archivist at the Royal Anthropological Institute in 1992. He has published on a number of topics including the relationship between art and anthropology and photography in the Solomon Islands.
