= Deborah Lutz =

American Victorianist

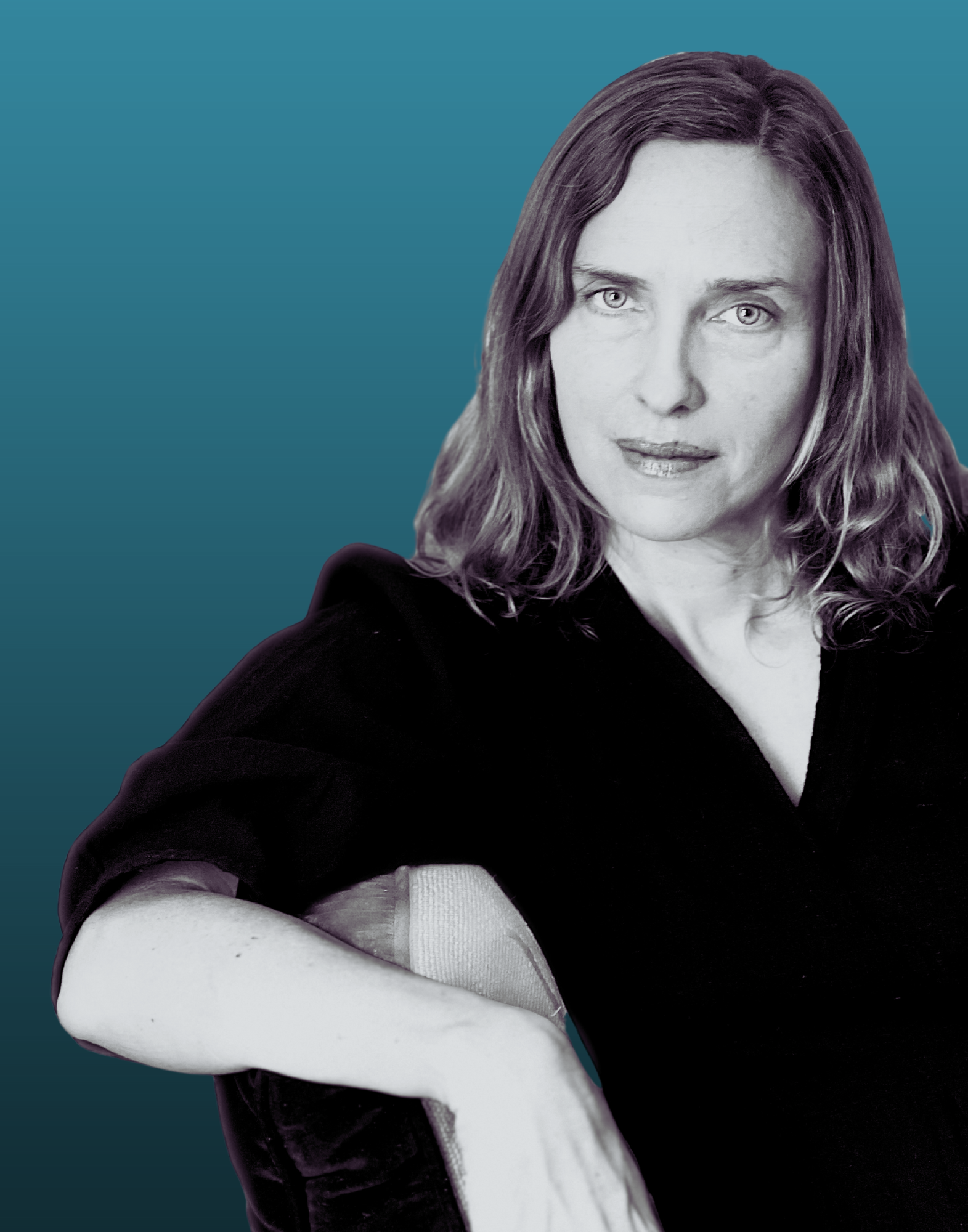
Deborah Lutz

Deborah Lutz (born 1970) is an American academic and writer. She is the George and Barbara Kelly Professor in Nineteenth-Century English and American Literature at Pennsylvania State University.

Her scholarship focuses on Victorian literature, material culture, the history of sexuality, gender and LGBTQ+ studies, and the history of the book.

== Career ==
Lutz received her PhD from the Graduate Center of the City University of New York. She is the author of six books, including The Dangerous Lover (2006), Pleasure Bound (2011), The Brontë Cabinet (2015), Relics of Death in Victorian Literature and Culture (2015),, Victorian Paper Art and Craft (2022), and This Dark Night: Emily Brontë, A Life (2026). The Brontë Cabinet was shortlisted for the PEN/Weld Award for Biography, and has been translated into Spanish and Japanese. She is the editor of two Norton Critical Editions—Jane Eyre and Strange Case of Dr. Jekyll and Mr. Hyde.

Lutz has received fellowships from the Guggenheim Foundation, the National Endowment for the Humanities, the American Council of Learned Societies, the Mellon Foundation at the Huntington Library, and the New York Public Library's Dorothy and Lewis B. Cullman Center for Scholars and Writers. She is also a fellow of the New York Institute for the Humanities.

== Books ==
- -----. The Dangerous Lover: Gothic Villains, Byronism, and the Nineteenth-Century Seduction Narrative. Ohio State University Press, 2006. ISBN 978-0-8142-5286-4 OCLC 63187398
- -----. Pleasure Bound: Victorian Sex Rebels and the New Eroticism. W. W. Norton & Company, 2011. ISBN 978-0-393-06832-0 OCLC 601106342
- -----. The Brontë Cabinet: Three Lives in Nine Objects. W.W. Norton, 2015. ISBN 978-0-393-35270-2 OCLC 891611162
- -----. Relics of Death in Victorian Literature and Culture . Cambridge University Press, 2015. ISBN 9781139924887 OCLC 8987703 99
- -----. Victorian Paper Art and Craft: Writers and Their Materials. Oxford University Press, 2022. ISBN 9780198858799 OCLC 1346368125
- -----. This Dark Night: Emily Brontë, A Life. W. W. Norton & Company, 2026. ISBN 9781324037118
