= Claire Harman (writer) =

British writer and critic

Claire Harman FRSL
- Occupation: Writer and biographer
- Period: 1989–present
- Subject: Literary biography, short fiction, poetry
- Notable works: Fanny Burney; Jane's Fame: How Jane Austen Conquered the World; Katherine Mansfield and the Art of Risking Everything
- Notable awards: John Lllewyn Rhys Prize; Forward Prize; Tom Gallon Award

Website
- www.claireharman.com

Claire Harman is a British literary critic and book reviewer who has written for the Times Literary Supplement, Literary Review, Evening Standard, the Sunday Telegraph and other publications. Harman is a fellow of the Royal Society of Literature, and has taught English at the Universities of Oxford and Manchester. She has taught creative writing at Columbia University, and been Professor of Creative Writing at Durham University since 2016.

Harman won the John Llewellyn Rhys Prize in 1989 for her biography of poet Sylvia Townsend Warner. This was followed with eponymous biographies of Fanny Burney in 2000 and Robert Louis Stevenson in 2005. In 2009, Harman published Jane's Fame, a book about the posthumous fame of novelist Jane Austen.

In 2015, Harman published what the Guardian called an 'eminently sensible' biography of Charlotte Bronte. In the same year, she won the Forward Prize for Best Single Poem of the year for "The Mighty Hudson", first published in the Times Literary Supplement. In 2016, Harman won the ALCS Tom-Gallon Trust Award for a short story. This was followed by Murder by the Book; A Sensational Chapter in Victorian Crime in 2018.

Harman returned to literary biography with the 'innovative' All Sorts of Lives: Katherine Mansfield and the Art of Risking Everything in 2023.

Harman was elected a Fellow of the Royal Society of Literature in 2006. She is a judge of the J.R. Ackerley Prize.

== Bibliography ==
=== Biographies ===
- 1989 — Sylvia Townsend Warner, Chatto & Windus/Minerva
- 2000 — Fanny Burney: A biography, HarperCollins Publishers. ISBN 978-0-00-739189-9.
- 2005 — Robert Louis Stevenson, HarperCollins
- 2015 — Charlotte Brontë: A Life, Viking Penguin
- 2016 — Charlotte Brontë: A Fiery Heart, Knopf Doubleday Publishing Group
- 2022 — All Sorts of Lives: Katherine Mansfield and the Art of Risking Everything, Chatto & Windus

=== Criticism ===
- 2009 — Jane's Fame, Canongate

=== Other non-fiction ===
- 2019 — Murder by the Book: The Crime That Shocked Dickens's London, Knopf
