= Friends of the Nations' Libraries =

British charitable organization

The Friends of the Nations' Libraries is a British registered charity founded in 1931 that supports the British Library, the National Library of Scotland and the National Library of Wales and other libraries in the UK recognised as being of national importance.

It changed its name in September 2024 from the Friends of the National Libraries in order to clarify that its grants are available to public and university libraries as well as national libraries.
