= Listed buildings in Burrow-with-Burrow =

Burrow-with-Burrow is a civil parish in Lancaster, Lancashire, England. It contains 25 listed buildings that are recorded in the National Heritage List for England. Of these, one is listed at Grade I, the highest of the three grades, one is at Grade II*, the middle grade, and the others are at Grade II, the lowest grade. It contains a number of small settlements, including Nether Burrow, Over Burrow, Overtown and Cowan Bridge, and is otherwise rural. The major building in the parish is Burrow Hall; this country house and structures associated with it are listed. Most of the older listed buildings are domestic or agricultural, including houses and associated structures, farmhouses, and farm buildings. Later listed structures are four milestones and four boundary stones. The other listed buildings are a bridge, and inscribed stones re-set into a different bridge.

== Key ==
Grade	Criteria
I	Buildings of exceptional interest, sometimes considered to be internationally important
II*	Particularly important buildings of more than special interest
II	Buildings of national importance and special interest

== Buildings ==
Name and location	Photograph	Date	Notes	Grade
Overtown Farmhouse; 54.18047°N 2.56997°W	—	17th century	The house was altered and extended in the following two centuries. It is in stone with slate roofs, and has two storeys with an attic. The house has a complex plan, and includes a stair tower. Many original internal features have been retained.	II
Fairthwaite Park House; 54.18753°N 2.55542°W	—	1676 (probable)	A large sandstone house with a slate roof, consisting of a five-bay hall and two projecting gabled wings. The doorway has n embattled and inscribed lintel, and the windows are mullioned. At the rear is a former granary and a 19th-century wing that are linked to the original part of the house.	II
High Gale Farmhouse; 54.18452°N 2.56742°W	—	1678	The stone house with a slate roof has two storeys and attics. The main part has three bays with sash windows, The central doorway has a moulded surround and a battlemented and inscribed lintel. To the right are two bays containing mullioned windows.	II
Johnson House and farmbuildings 54.17903°N 2.58944°W		1680	In sandstone with a slate roof, the house originally had one bay on each side of a central two-storey porch. It has two storeys and an attic. An extension was added to the left, followed later by farm buildings to the right. In the porch is a mullioned and transomed window. Most of the other windows are mullioned, other than a sliding sash window in the attic. The doorway has a moulded surround and a battlemented and inscribed lintel.	II
Yew Tree Farmhouse; 54.17814°N 2.59134°W	—	1706	The house is in pebbledashed stone with a slate roof. It has two storeys and three bays, Above the doorway is an inscribed lintel. The windows vary; some are mullioned, others are sashes or modern replacements.	II
Inscribed stones, Burrow Bridge; 54.17442°N 2.59239°W		1733	Burrow Bridge was rebuilt in 1968, and a stone was re-set into the pedestrian refuge on each side. Both are inscribed with names, one has the date 1733, and the other 1735.	II
Burrow Hall; 54.17742°N 2.58915°W		c. 1740	The country house is on the site of a former Roman fort. It is in sandstone with a slate roof. The south front has seven bays, the three central bays projecting forward under a pediment. There is an Ionic porch with a modillioned pediment. The east front has ten bays and a Tuscan porch. On the west side are a projecting south block and a north wing. The interior contains elaborately decorated plasterwork.	I
Stable block, Burrow Hall; 54.17793°N 2.58883°W	—	c. 1740	The stable block is in sandstone with slate roofs. It has a U-shaped plan with wings protruding to the west. The wings and the block between have broken pediments with lunettes. On the east face is a garden seat in a Venetian-shaped alcove with panelled pilasters. This is contained in a central gabled projection with an oculus in the gable. The windows are sashes.	II*
Gate piers, Burrow Hall; 54.17758°N 2.59141°W		Mid 18th century	The pair of gate piers are at the entrance of the drive to the hall, They are in rusticated sandstone ashlar. They have a square plan, moulded bases and modillioned cornices.	II
Summer house, Burrow Hall; 54.17866°N 2.58843°W	—	Mid 18th century	The former summer house is in sandstone with a glazed roof. It has an octagonal plan, Three sides facing south have round-headed openings with keystones and pilasters.	II
Barn, Johnson House; 54.17868°N 2.58926°W	—	Late 18th century	The barn is in sandstone with a slate roof. It contains two entrances with segmental heads, ventilation slits, and doorways. There is also a blocked doorway above which is a battlemented and inscribed lintel.	II
Brontë Cottage; 54.18410°N 2.56213°W		Late 18th century	A row of stone cottages with a slate roof in two storeys. Some windows are mullioned; some are sashes and others are replacements. Two single-storey canted bay windows have been added. A plaque on the gable end states that the Brontë sisters lived here when they attended the nearby school run by William Carus Wilson.	II
Cowan Bridge; 54.18382°N 2.56157°W		Late 18th century (probable)	The bridge carries a road over Leck Beck, but has been superseded by a modern bridge to the northeast. It is in sandstone and consists of a single segmental arch. Its solid parapets have rounded tops.	II
Milestone; 54.19568°N 2.58446°W	—	Late 18th century (probable)	The milestone is on the northeast side of the A65 road. It is in sandstone, with a roughly square plan and a rounded top. The left face is inscribed "1", and the right face "6".	II
Burrow Cottage; 54.17282°N 2.59204°W	—	Early 19th century	A sandstone house with a slate roof, in two storeys and with two bays. The door and windows have plain surrounds, and the windows are sashes.	II
County boundary stone 54.19530°N 2.58610°W	—	Early 19th century	The stone marked the former boundary between Westmorland and Lancashire. It is an upright stone in sandstone with a pitched top. The face is inscribed with the names of the parishes and the counties.	II
Summerfield House; 54.19303°N 2.58570°W	—	1841	A country house by George Webster in limestone with dressings mainly in sandstone. It has a symmetrical three-bay north front, the central bay projecting forward. The doorway has a round head and a Doric porch. The west front is also symmetrical, and has two single-bay blocks between which is a single-bay link. The windows are sashes.	II
Lodge, Summerfield House; 54.19399°N 2.58358°W		1840s	The lodge, designed by George Webster, is in sandstone with a hipped slate roof. It has one storey with an attic. The north front has a projecting centre with a pedimented gable, with one bay on each side. The windows are mullioned, and the chimneys have octagonal shafts.	II
Gate piers, Summerfield House; 54.19406°N 2.58349°W	—	1840s (possible)	The gate piers are at the entrance to the drive to the house. They are in rusticated sandstone ashlar. The piers are circular, on square bases, with rounded tops and ball finials.	II
Boundary stone 54.19526°N 2.58384°W	—	Mid 19th century (probable)	The stone marks the boundary with Casterton, Cumbria. It is in sandstone and has a triangular plan, with inscriptions on the sloping top and the sides.	II
Boundary stone 54.16433°N 2.59690°W	—	19th century	The stone marks the boundary with Tunstall. It is in sandstone and has a triangular plan with a rounded top. The faces are inscribed with the names of the parishes.	II
Boundary stone 54.18342°N 2.56080°W	—	Mid 19th century	The stone marks the boundary with Leck. It is in sandstone and has a triangular plan with a sloping top inscribed "Cowan Bridge". The other faces are inscribed with the names of the parishes.	II
Milestone; 54.17095°N 2.59385°W	—	Mid 19th century	The milestone is on the east side of the A683 road outside the Highwayman Inn. It is in sandstone with a triangular plan and a sloping top inscribed "Burrow". On the sides are the distances in miles to Hornby, Lancaster, Kirkby Lonsdale, and Sedbergh.	II
Milestone; 54.18456°N 2.59297°W	—	Mid 19th century	The milestone is on the east side of the A683 road. It is in sandstone with a triangular plan and a sloping top inscribed "Burrow". On the sides are the distances in miles to Hornby, Lancaster, Kirkby Lonsdale, and Sedbergh.	II
Milestone; 54.18770°N 2.56797°W	—	Mid 19th century	The milestone is on the west side of the A65 road. It is in sandstone with a rectangular plan, set diagonally, and has a rounded top. The left side is inscribed "KL 2 MILES", and the right side "S 15 MILES".	II
