= Over Burrow Roman Fort =

Roman fort in Burrow-with-Burrow, Lancaster, England

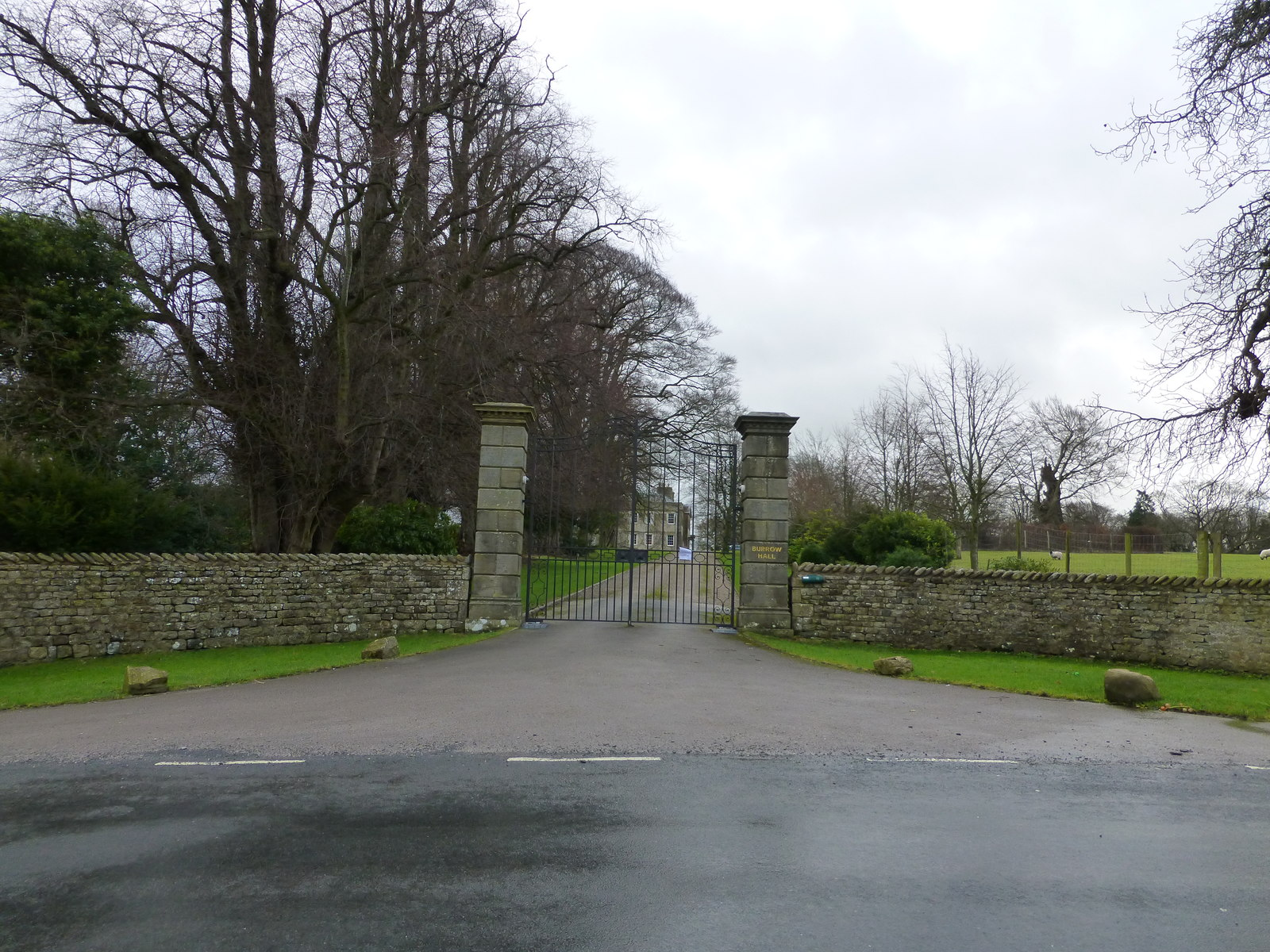
- Entrance to Burrow Hall

- Location within the City of Lancaster district Location within Lancashire
- 54.1782°N 2.5892°W
- Location: Burrow-with-Burrow, Lancaster, Lancashire, England

History
- Founded: c. 80 AD

Site notes
- Condition: Earthworks

Over Burrow Roman Fort is the modern name given to a former Roman fort at Over Burrow (or Burrow-in-Londsale), Lancashire in North West England. Today it is the site of the 18th-century country house Burrow Hall. The first castra is thought to have been founded in the first century AD within the Roman province of Britannia.

The fort's Roman name is not known, but is assumed to be one of those recorded in Route X of the Antonine Itinerary. Galacum or Calacum, originally conjectured by William Camden, was still being proposed in 1979. However, in 1998 David Shotter suggested that Galacum would be more appropriately applied to Lancaster and Alone (previously assigned to Watercrook in Cumbria) for Over Burrow. Camden also associated the site with Ptolemy's Καλαγον, one of the cities of the Brigantes.

The fort is likely the origin of the modern name as Burrow comes from the Old English burh meaning fortified place.

== History ==
The fort was likely built on the slight prominence northwest of the River Lune's confluence with Leck Beck, to command a crossing over the river. A short distance to the south the ground falls steeply to Leck Beck and more immediately on the east, to a small unnamed tributary. The site is on the route of the Roman road up the Lune Valley from Lancaster, but not at the junction with the older road north from Ribchester which passes about 1.2 kilometres (0.75 mi) to the east. A western road can still be traced in the field heading toward the Lune, thought to continue on to Watercrook, but its route from the opposite bank is still uncertain.

Evidence suggests that a timber fort was established here late in the first century (during the Flavian dynasty) but little is known about it. Archaeological excavation of the clay-and-turf ramparts and defensive ditches also suggests a second period of occupation at a so far undetermined time.

Probably in the late third or early fourth century, a stone-built fort was constructed, apparently on a slightly different alignment. The fort had a rectangular plan with rounded corners, about 143 by 136 metres (470 by 445 ft) (area c.1.9 hectares (4.75 acres)). The location of the northern and southern gates has been positively identified, and the western is possibly sited near the present-day gate to the hall. Much of the eastern wall is thought to be under the hall and stable block to the rear. The masonry has been robbed for other purposes but the foundations are approximately 1.4 metres (4 ft 6 in) wide.

A substantial extramural settlement (vicus) seems to have developed along the roads to the north and west.

Part of an inscribed Roman stone with dedications to Asclepius and Hygieia, presumed to be from the site, has been built into the surround of a window in the north aisle of St John the Baptist's Church, Tunstall. An altar with a dedication to Contrebis was reported to have been found in the wall of a nearby building, pulled down around the time that Burrow Hall was built.

The area directly to the south of the fort is still not fully understood. An apparent rampart is visible alongside the modern A683 road, possibly part of an annex or earlier camp. In the 18th and 19th centuries it was presumed that this was the site of the fort, with the escarpment created by erosion from Leck Beck having since destroyed its south rampart. Excavations in the early 1950s show that during its lifetime a poorly constructed building, built over the roadway, was inserted into the south gateway, narrowing the portal to half the width. This could represent a later, final phase of occupation at the site.

The area is a protected scheduled monument. Burrow Hall is also a Grade I listed building.

== See also ==
- Listed buildings in Burrow-with-Burrow
- Scheduled monuments in Lancashire

== Bibliography ==
- Historic England. "Roman fort and civil settlement, Over Burrow (1005101)". National Heritage List for England.
- Historic England. "Burrow Hall (1362517)". National Heritage List for England.
- "OS One Inch" (Map). National Library of Scotland. 7. Ordnance Survey. 1955.
- Ekwall, Eilert (1922). The place-names of Lancashire. Manchester University Press. OCLC 1050784099.
- Birley, Eric (1946). "The Roman Site at Burrow in Lonsdale" (PDF). Transactions of the Cumberland & Westmorland Antiquarian & Archaeological Society. 46: 126–156. https://doi.org/10.5284/1062844
- Hildyard, Edward (1954). "Excavations at Burrow in Lonsdale, 1952-53" (PDF). Transactions of the Cumberland & Westmorland Antiquarian & Archaeological Society. 54: 66–101. https://doi.org/10.5284/1062640
- Rivet, A. L. F.; Smith, Colin (1979). The Place-Names of Roman Britain. London: B. T. Batsford. p. 382. ISBN 0713420774.
- Shotter, David (1998). "Roman Names for Roman Sites in North West England" (PDF). Contrebis. 23. Lancaster Archaeological and Historical Society. ISSN 0307-5087. OCLC 4447474.
- Shotter, David; White, Andrew (1995). The Romans in Lunesdale. Centre for North-West Regional Studies, University of Lancaster. ISBN 0901800686.
- Ratledge, David. "The Roman Road from Lancaster to Burrow (in Lonsdale)". Roman Roads Research Association.
- Ratledge, David. "The Roman Road Burrow (in Lonsdale) to the North West". Roman Roads Research Association.
