= Carus-Wilson =

Carus-Wilson or Carus Wilson is a surname. Notable people with the surname include:

- Cecil Carus-Wilson (1857–1934), British politician
- Eleanora Carus-Wilson (1897–1977), British economic historian
- William Carus Wilson (1791–1859), English churchman and editor
