= Listed buildings in Casterton, Cumbria =

Casterton is a civil parish in Westmorland and Furness, Cumbria, England. It contains 18 listed buildings that are recorded in the National Heritage List for England. Of these, one is listed at Grade I, the highest of the three grades, one is at Grade II*, the middle grade, and the others are at Grade II, the lowest grade. The parish contains the village of Casterton and the surrounding countryside. The listed buildings include country houses and associated structures, farmhouses and farm buildings, bridges, limekilns, a milestone, and a church.

== Key ==
Grade	Criteria
I	Buildings of exceptional interest, sometimes considered to be internationally important
II*	Particularly important buildings of more than special interest
II	Buildings of national importance and special interest

== Buildings ==
Name and location	Photograph	Date	Notes	Grade
Devil's Bridge; 54.19840°N 2.59070°W		c. 1200	The bridge carries Bridge Brow over the River Lune. It is built in sandstone, and consists of three round arches with triple chamfers, the eastern arch being smaller. The piers have triangular cutwaters on each side, and rise to form polygonal refuges. On the bridge is a string course, the parapets are coped, the abutments are canted, and the roadway is about 4 metres (13 ft) wide. On the parapets are an inscription and a sundial. The bridge is also a scheduled monument.	I
Kirfitt Hall and outbuilding 54.20906°N 2.58769°W	—	Early 17th century (probable)	The farmhouse was remodelled and a stair tower built later in the 17th century, and the outbuilding to the south was added in the 18th century. The building is in stone, partly roughcast, it has a slate roof, and an L-shaped plan. There are two storeys, each wing has four bays, and in the northwest wing is a four-stage tower with a pyramidal roof. The doorway has a flat bracketed canopy, and the windows are of various types.	II
Casterton Old Hall; 54.21168°N 2.57852°W	—	17th century	Originally a house, later part of a school, it is in stone and has a slate roof. There are two storeys, attics and a basement, a south front of four bays, and a rear gabled wing. The second bay projects forward under a catslide roof, forming a porch, and the entrance has pilasters, a lintel with a keystone, a pulvinated frieze with rosettes, a cornice, and a slate canopy. The windows have chamfered surrounds, they are mullioned, and most have transoms and hood moulds.	II
Bee Nest Farmhouse; 54.20738°N 2.57294°W	—	1723	The farmhouse is in stone and has a slate roof with coped gables. There are two storeys with attics, five bays, and a gabled range at the rear. The windows have chamfered surrounds and hood moulds; in the lower floor they are casements, and in the upper floor they are sashes. The doorway has an architrave.	II
Barn, Bee Nest Farm; 54.20748°N 2.57350°W	—	18th century (probable)	A double barn, including a pigsty and a hen house, it is in stone with a slate roof. There are two segmental-headed entrances, and at the rear is a continuous outshut. On the left side is an outshut and steps leading to a first floor doorway.	II
Bellgate Farmhouse; 54.22092°N 2.56520°W	—	18th century (probable)	The farmhouse, which incorporates earlier features, is in roughcast stone with a slate roof. It has two storeys, two bays, and a rear wing. The windows have chamfered surrounds, two have retained their mullions, some contain sashes and others casements. The central doorway has a gabled porch, and in the right gable are dove holes.	II
Limekiln; 54.21428°N 2.57064°W	—	18th century (probable)	The limekiln is in stone, it is a rounded structure built into a hillside, and faces north. The fire hole has corbelled jambs and a lintel.	II
Two limekilns 54.22566°N 2.52015°W		18th century (probable)	The adjoining limekilns are in stone and face east. They have corbelled fire holes that are partly blocked.	II
Two limekilns 54.23128°N 2.51893°W		18th century (probable)	The adjoining limekilns are in stone and face north, the west limekiln projecting. They have corbelled fire holes, that to the east with an asymmetrical opening, and the one to the west higher and partly blocked.	II
Gatehouse; 54.20651°N 2.58200°W	—	Mid to late 18th century (probable)	Originally a toll house for the Kendal to Kirkby Lonsdale Turnpike, and later a private house, it is in plastered stone with a slate roof. In the centre is a two-storey bowed bay window under a gabled roof extending over the single-storey outer bays. At the rear is a gabled wing, and on the right is an outshut with a catslide roof. Flanking the bay window are doorways; the left doorway has a gabled timber porch and the right doorway is blocked.	II
Limekiln; 54.21216°N 2.58210°W	—	18th or 19th century (probable)	The limekiln is in stone and has a fire hole at the base with canted sides. The upper part is recessed and rounded, and there is a round charge hole.	II
Casterton Hall; 54.20884°N 2.58502°W	—	1811	A country house with an orangery, and a service wing to the rear. The buildings are in stone with slate roofs. The house has a band, a top frieze, a cornice, a parapet, and a hipped roof. There are two storeys and five bays. The porch is semicircular, and has two unfluted Doric columns and half-columns, a frieze and a modillioned cornice, and the door has an architrave and a fanlight. On the west front is a three-bay bow window. The orangery has a single storey and five bays, and a tetrastyle Doric portico. Most of the windows are sashes.	II*
Cow shelter 54.20773°N 2.58142°W	—	Early 19th century (probable)	The building is designed in a rustic Doric style, and is in stone with a slate roof. It has a single storey and three bays, and on the east front are four round piers supporting an timber beam. The upper parts of the outer bays are open.	II
Milestone; 54.21549°N 2.57713°W		Early 19th century (probable)	The milepost has a circular plan, a square base, and broaches. It is inscribed with "CASTERTON" on the base and with initials and numbers on the upper part.	II
Old Manor; 54.20406°N 2.57446°W	—	Early 19th century	The rear wing is earlier. The house is in stone with a slate roof. The main part has a hipped roof, three bays on the front and two on the sides. The windows moulded frames, and contain pairs of casements with pointed heads, and above are hood moulds. The doorway has a fanlight and a pointed head. There is a two-bay north wing with sash windows.	II
Holy Trinity Church; 54.21149°N 2.57716°W		1831–33	The church, founded by Rev William Carus Wilson, was almost certainly designed by George Webster, and the chancel was replaced in about 1860 by E. G. Paley. The original part of the church is limestone, and the chancel is in sandstone. The church consists of a nave with a south porch and a north vestry, a chancel with a north organ loft, and a partly-embraced west tower that has a plain parapet raised at the corners. The windows are lancets.	II
Lodge to Whelprigg; 54.22517°N 2.57466°W	—	1860	The lodge is in stone with quoins, and has a slate roof with coped gables and finials. There are two storeys and three bays; the third bay projects forward and is gabled with a hipped roof. The windows have chamfered mullions, elliptical-headed lights, and most contain sashes and have hood moulds. The porch is gabled and has a round-arched opening.	II
Railway underbridge 54.22512°N 2.57504°W		c. 1861	The bridge was built to carry the Ingleton Branch Line of the Lancaster and Carlisle Railway over the entrance to the drive of the Whelprigg Estate. It is in stone, and consists of a round arch with voussoirs, a frieze, a cornice, parapets with ashlar coping, and raking abutments.	II
