= Burrow Hall =

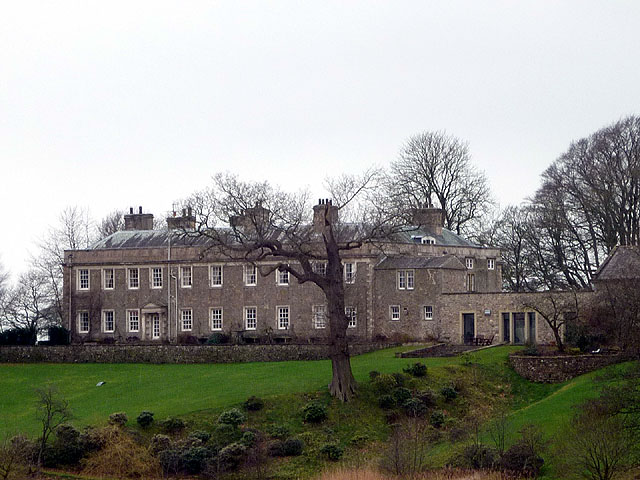
- The east facade

- Location within the City of Lancaster district

General information
- Type: Country house
- Location: Burrow-with-Burrow, Lancashire, England
- Coordinates: 54.1776°N 2.5890°W
- Opening: c. 1740

Technical details
- Material: Sandstone ashlar

Design and construction
- Architects: Westby Gill with alteration and renovation work by Mason Gillibrand Architects

Listed Building – Grade I
- Designated: 4 October 1967
- Reference no.: 1362517

Listed Building – Grade II*
- Official name: Stable block north of Burrow Hall
- Designated: 4 October 1967
- Reference no.: 1164344

Burrow Hall is a large 18th-century country house in Burrow-with-Burrow, Lancashire, England, which lies in the Lune Valley on the A683 some 2 miles (3 km) south of Kirkby Lonsdale.

The house is built of sandstone ashlar with a slate roof. The south facing façade is composed of seven bays, three of which project under a pediment. The east facing façade has ten bays. The hall is recorded in the National Heritage List for England as a designated Grade I listed building, and the stable block to the rear is listed Grade II*.

The house has a number of impressive ornate plaster ceilings, attributed to Italians Francesco Vassalli and Martino Quadry, who were also thought to have done work at Towneley Hall, Burnley and Shugborough in Staffordshire.

Burrow Hall was built over the site of a Roman Fort, the initial construction of which is thought to date to the Flavian period. Remains are thought to be under the Main Hall, although archaeological work during the renovations in 2014 uncovered no significant evidence of that.

== History ==
Jane and Alice Tatham, the heiresses of the Old Hall estate at Nether Burrow, married John Fenwick of Nunriding Hall, Northumberland in 1687 and Thomas Robson of Bishop Auckland in 1686 respectively, Fenwick eventually inheriting the whole estate. In 1690 John Fenwick purchased what was then known as the New Hall in Over Burrow, which had been erected by Colonel Edward Briggs. And in 1695 he also acquired the manor of Claughton. Colonel Briggs seems to have acquired the land here before 1654.

The present house was built by Westby Gill c. 1740 for Robert Fenwick, the son of John and Jane, who was MP for Lancaster. Robert died unmarried and the estate passed to a nephew John Wilson, who took the surname Fenwick. He died without an heir and the estate passed to his cousin Nicholas Lambert, who also took the name of Fenwick and died childless. It then passed to his cousin's son Thomas Lambert who also changed his name to Fenwick. The estate came down to Sarah Fenwick Bowen who married Edward Matthew Reid, who also then took the surname of Fenwick, after which ownership passed down through successive further generations of Fenwicks.

In 2014 the house underwent extensive renovation work including the demolition of a modern glazed link building between the Hall and the Stable Block. The work was done by Mason Gillibrand Architects of Caton.

In November 2016 at the Georgian Group Awards held at the Royal Institute of British Architects (RIBA) headquarters in London the project was given a commendation in the 'Restoration of a Georgian Country House' category.

== See also ==
- Listed buildings in Burrow-with-Burrow
