= Holy Trinity Church, Casterton =

Coordinates: 54.2115°N 2.5771°W

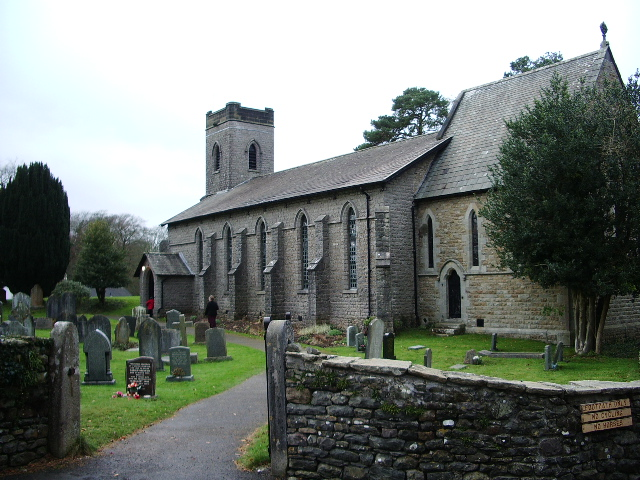
- Holy Trinity Church, Casterton, from the southeast

- Location in Cumbria
- OS grid reference: SD 625,797
- Location: Casterton, Cumbria
- Country: England
- Denomination: Anglican
- Website: Holy Trinity, Casterton

History
- Status: Parish church
- Founded: 1831
- Founder: Rev William Carus Wilson

Architecture
- Functional status: Active
- Heritage designation: Grade II
- Designated: 21 February 1989
- Architect(s): George Webster; E. G. Paley
- Architectural type: Church
- Style: Gothic Revival
- Groundbreaking: 1831
- Completed: c. 1860

Specifications
- Materials: Limestone and sandstone with ashlar dressings

Administration
- Province: York
- Diocese: Carlisle
- Archdeaconry: Westmoreland and Furness
- Deanery: Kendal
- Parish: Kirkby Lonsdale

Clergy
- Rector: Rev Richard John Snow

Holy Trinity Church is in the village of Casterton, Cumbria, England. It is an active Anglican parish church in the deanery of Kendal, the archdeaconry of Westmorland and Furness, and the diocese of Carlisle. Its benefice is united with those of five local parishes, the benefice being entitled Kirkby Lonsdale Team Ministry. The church is recorded in the National Heritage List for England as a designated Grade II listed building.

== History ==
The church was built between 1831 and 1833. It was founded by Rev William Carus Wilson, who also founded the Clergy Daughters' School that was attended by the Brontë sisters. The architectural historians Matthew Hyde and Nikolaus Pevsner state in the Buildings of England series that "the architect was almost certainly George Webster". In about 1860 the small chancel was replaced by a larger one designed by the Lancaster architect E. G. Paley.

== Architecture ==
=== Exterior ===
The original part of the church is constructed in rock-faced limestone, the chancel in rock-faced sandstone, both with ashlar dressings. Its plan consists of a six-bay nave with a south porch and a north vestry, a chancel with an organ loft to the north, and a west tower. The tower is partly embraced in the nave, forming a baptistry; Hyde and Pevsner state that it is "undersized". It is supported by diagonal buttresses, the bell openings are louvred with pointed heads and hoodmoulds, and the parapet is plain with raised angles. On the west side are two windows, one above the other, and a clock face. Along the sides of the nave are lancet windows alternating with buttresses, above which is a continuous hoodmould. The chancel has a steeper roof than the nave, rising to a higher level. Its east end has a coped gable surmounted by a cross, and contains three stepped lancet windows. On the south side of the chancel are three lancet windows and a doorway; on the north side is a single lancet to the east of the organ loft.

=== Interior ===
The nave has a scissor truss roof, and the chancel a collar rafter roof. The font is octagonal, carried on clustered shafts. The memorials include one to Rev William Carus Wilson, who died in 1859. The reredos dates from 1897 and was designed by Austin and Paley. The stained glass window in the baptistry dated 1884 is by Shrigley and Hunt. The scheme of wall paintings and stained glass in the chancel was created between 1893 and 1899 by Henry Holiday. In the nave is a scheme of wall paintings by James Clark executed between 1905 and 1912. The two-manual organ was built in 1893 by J. W. Walker. The tower contains six bells, all cast at the Whitechapel Bell Foundry. Three bells cast in 1845 by Charles and George Mears are hung for ringing but are now unringable, and three larger bells cast in 1905 by Mears and Stainbank are hung for chiming.

== See also ==
- Listed buildings in Casterton, Cumbria
- List of works by George Webster
- List of ecclesiastical works by E. G. Paley
- List of ecclesiastical works by Austin and Paley (1895–1914)
