= Spirit of the Andes =

British Mail-order and Retail company

Spirit Of The Andes
- Company type: Private limited company
- Industry: Retail
- Founded: 1993
- Headquarters: Milton Keynes, United Kingdom
- Products: Clothing and Accessories
- Owner: Dale Stillman
- Parent: The Cashmere Centre
- Website: www.spiritoftheandes.co.uk

Spirit of the Andes is a Buckinghamshire-based mail order company, and retailer specializing in alpaca knitwear, Pima cotton clothing and accessories. It is owned by the Cashmere Centre Ltd., the owner the Pearl Company, Tesoro by Design, and James Alexander Clothing.

The company works with clothes designers and knitters in South America to sell their products to the United Kingdom and worldwide.

== History ==
The business was founded in 1993 and was based in Nether Burrow in Lancashire, United Kingdom. The retailer had shops around the country:

- Alresford in Hampshire
- Amersham in Buckinghamshire
- Bakewell in Derbyshire
- Bath in Somerset
- Broadway in Worcestershire
- Edinburgh in Lothian
- Farnham in Surrey
- Hay-on-Wye in Herefordshire
- Holt in Norfolk
- Hornby in Lancashire
- Lavenham in Suffolk
- Ludlow in Shropshire
- Oakham in Rutland
- Prestbury in Cheshire
- Sherborne in Dorset

On 20 July 2015 the company went into administration with 62 people losing their jobs. The brand was bought by Richard Hartley, owner of alpaca and Pima cotton clothing retailer The Alpaca Collection, based in Stratford-upon-Avon.

Hartley reopened Spirit Of The Andes shops in Bakewell, Holt and Hornby as well as selling from The Alpaca Collection's headquarters in Stratford-upon-Avon.

The company also had concession shops at House Of Marbles in Bovey Tracey, Devon; the Jinney Ring Craft Centre in Hanbury, Worcestershire, County Classics in Helmsley and Malton, North Yorkshire, and Asarti in Leiden, the Netherlands.

== Current ==
In 2018 Spirit of the Andes was bought by The Cashmere Centre Ltd. due to Richard Hartley retiring. The company continues to sell online and by telephone, producing a brochure twice a year for its Spring/Summer and Autumn/Winter Alpaca and Pima Cotton clothing collections. It has a single retail shop unit based next to the company offices located between Buckingham and Milton Keynes.
