= Casterton School =

Location
- Casterton, Cumbria, LA6 2SG; England
- Coordinates: 54.211667°N 2.574964°W

Information
- Type: Private day and boarding
- Motto: Cor Unum Via Una (One Heart, One Way)
- Religious affiliation: Church of England
- Established: 1823
- Founder: Rev Carus Wilson
- Closed: 2013 (absorbed by Sedbergh School)
- Local authority: Cumbria
- Gender: Girls; Boys (3-11)
- Age: 3 to 18
- Enrolment: 300~ (2013)
- Houses: Dobson; Vincent; Beale; Williams; Harben
- Colour: Blue

Casterton School was an independent boarding and day school for girls aged 3 to 18 years in the village of Casterton in rural Cumbria. In its final years it also admitted boys, up to the age of 11. The school ceased to exist in 2013, though a preparatory school remains on the site. It merged with Sedbergh School, whose junior section now occupies the campus while Casterton's senior school pupils moved to the Sedbergh site.

== History ==
Casterton School was founded in 1823 by Rev Carus Wilson as the Clergy Daughters' School in Cowan Bridge to educate daughters of financially disadvantaged clergymen. It moved to its site at Casterton in 1833. Four of the Brontë sisters (Maria, Elizabeth, Charlotte and Emily) attended the former Cowan Bridge School. A stone inscription to commemorate this is present at the original site and the former school at Casterton continued to acknowledge the literary connection by naming buildings accordingly until its closure.

In 2000 boys were admitted to the junior school.

Following a decline in pupil numbers, in March 2013 a merger was announced with Sedbergh School, effective from September 2013. Casterton's preparatory department remained on its site as Sedbergh's junior school was moved there, under the new name "Casterton, Sedbergh Preparatory School". Some of the Senior pupils transferred to the main campus in Sedbergh.

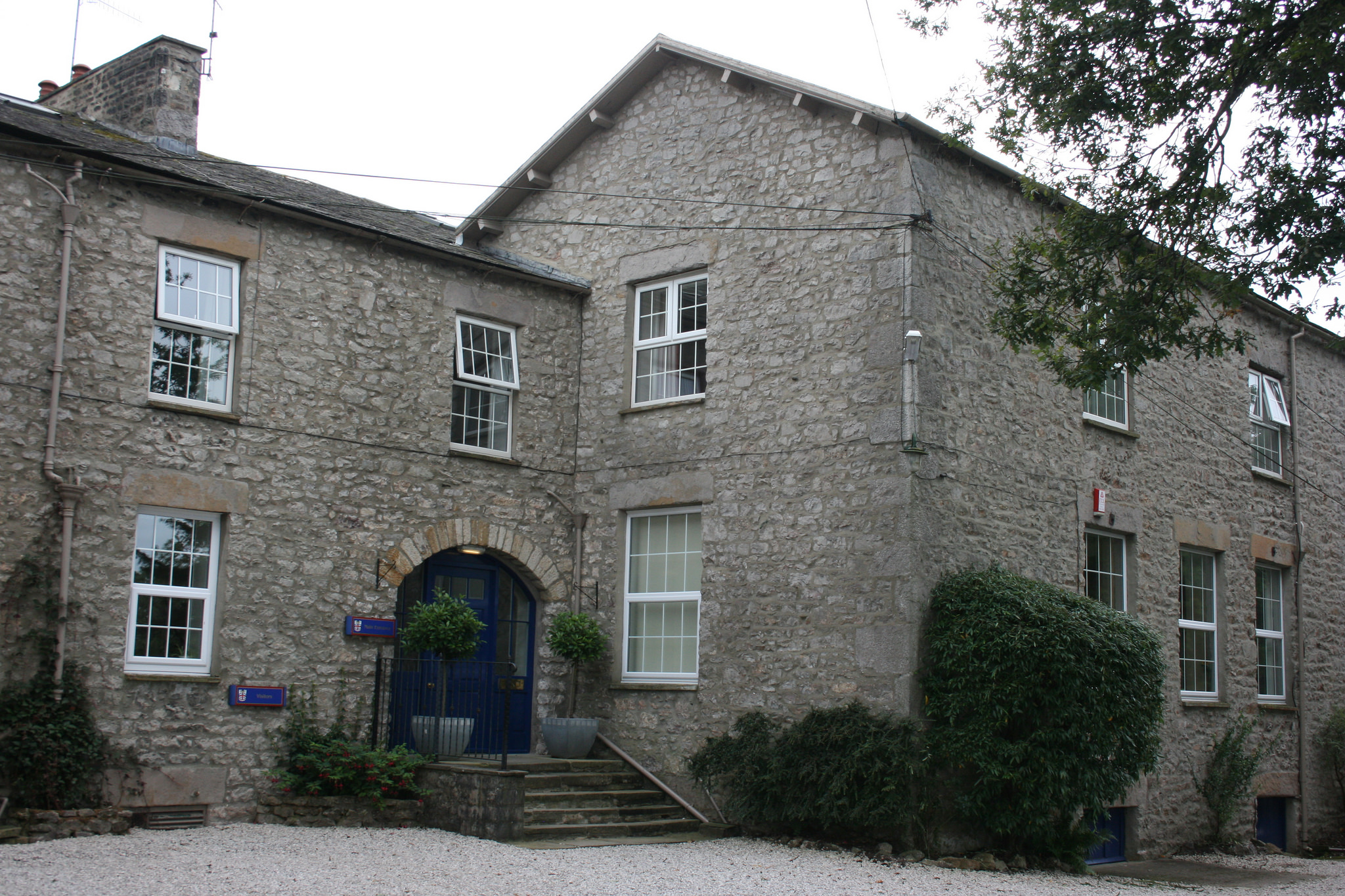
Casterton School

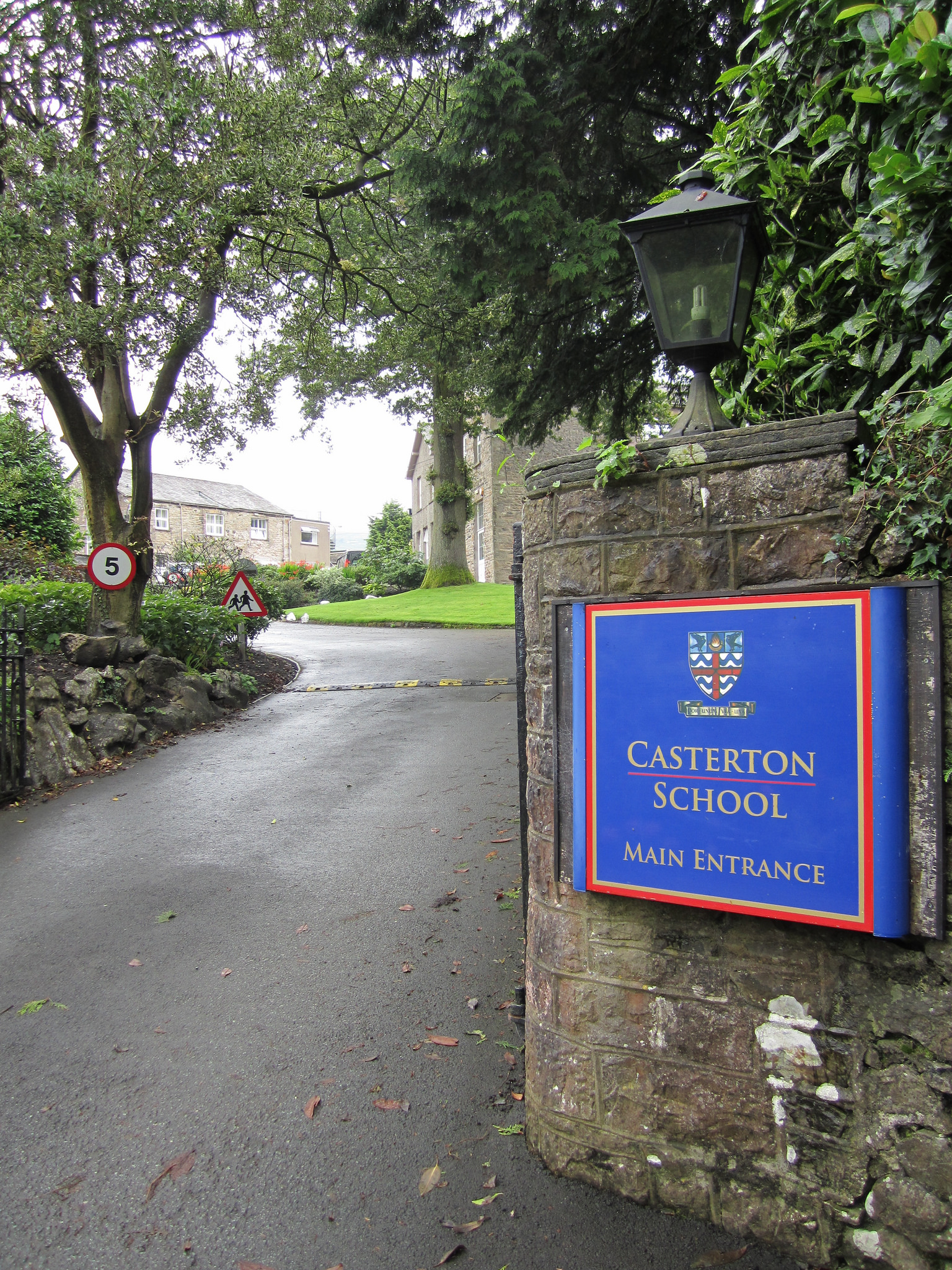
Main Entrance

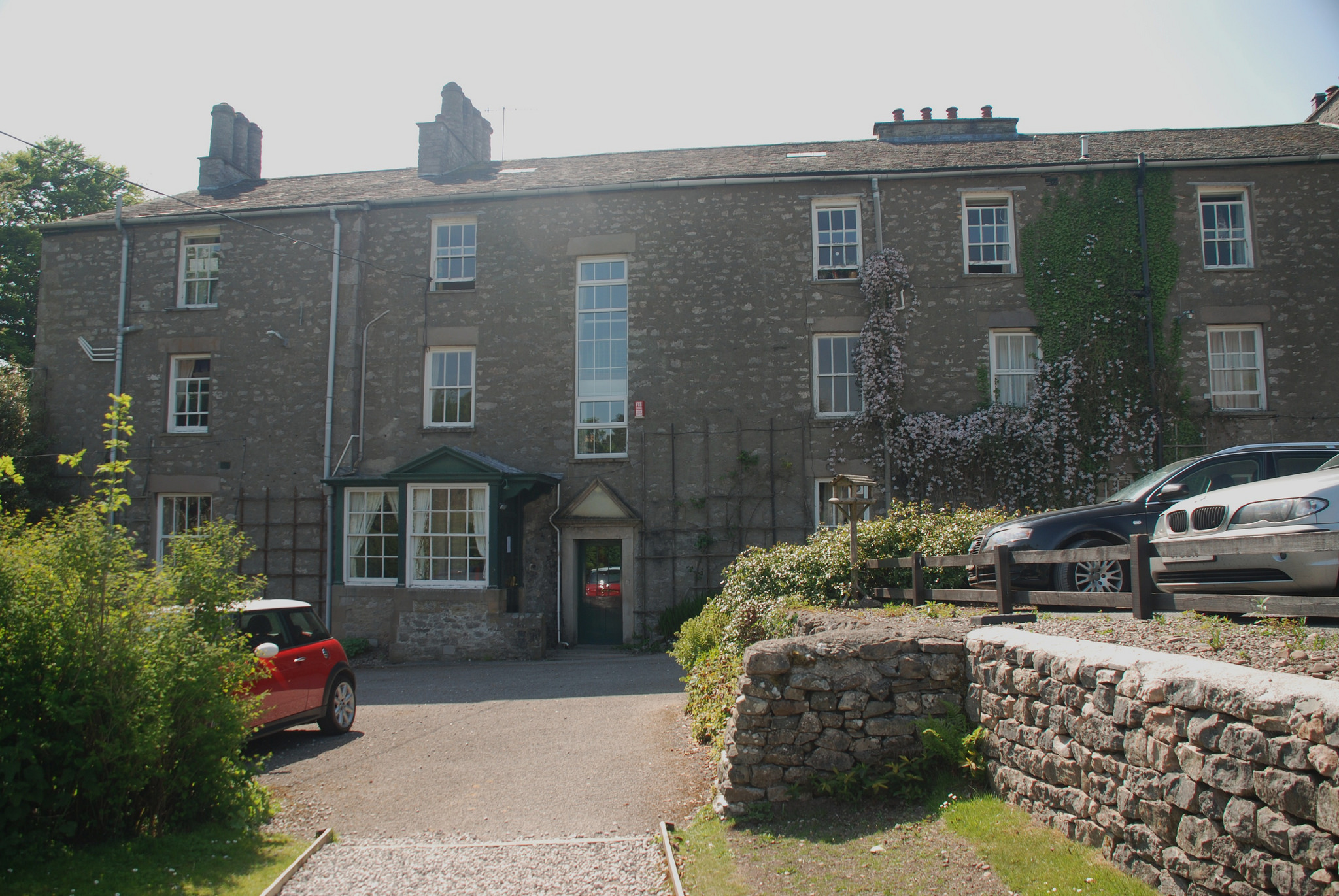
Bronte House

Memorial Window

== School song ==
The «Casterton School Song», has lyrics describing the surrounding area and a rousing chorus of 'Casterton, Casterton, Casterton, our school'. The lyrics were written by John Webster, Head of English and the music was written by Alvin Atkins, Head of Music. The song was sung at major school events such as Founder's Day and Speech Day. It was recorded in 1964, sung by the Girls of Casterton School.
