= James Clark (artist) =

English painter (1858-1943)

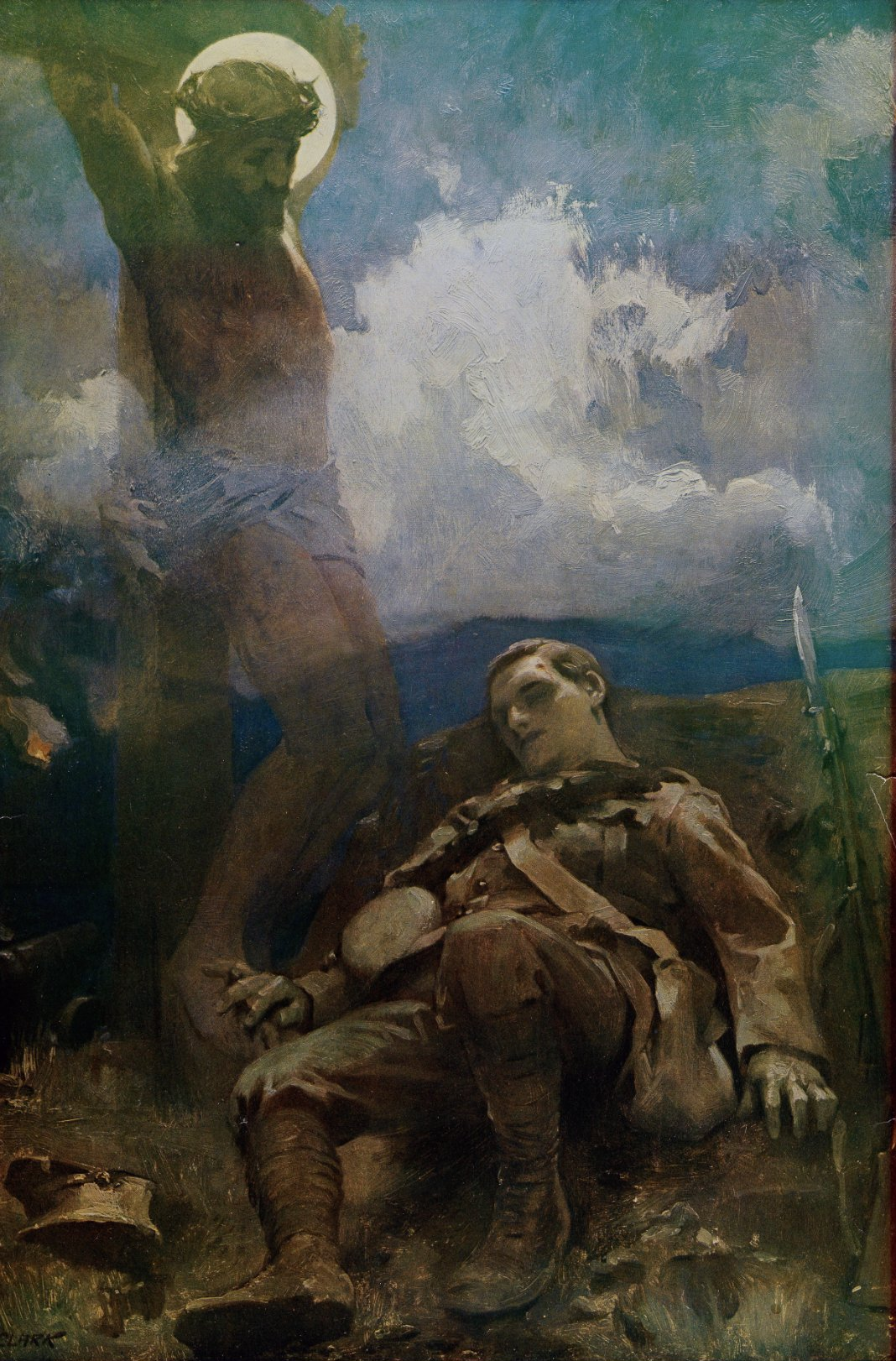
James Clark - The Great Sacrifice, 1914.

James Clark (1858–1943) was a provincial English painter born in West Hartlepool, in north-east England. He rose to prominence in 1914 when his painting entitled The Great Sacrifice was reproduced as the souvenir print issued by The Graphic illustrated newspaper with its Christmas number. The painting depicted a young soldier lying dead on the battlefield beneath a vision of Christ on the Cross. It had an immediate appeal to many, and prints were snapped up by churches, schools, and mission halls. One reviewer stated that the print had "turned railway bookstalls into wayside shrines." Framed copies were hung in churches next to Rolls of Honour, and clergymen gave sermons on the theme of the painting. The original oil painting was acquired by Queen Mary, wife of George V but several other copies were made. Clark also painted The Bombardment of the Hartlepools (16 December 1914) (Hartlepool Art Gallery). Clark designed a number of war memorials and his painting was the basis for several memorial stained glass windows in churches. He executed the scheme of wall paintings in the nave of Holy Trinity Church, Casterton, Cumbria, between 1905 and 1912.

James Clark was Queen Alexandra's art teacher and the author of many oils. He was one of two artists commissioned by the Scripture Gift Mission (SGM) to go to the Holy Land, the other being Henry Andrew Harper. He was particularly gifted at portraying characters in Palestine, used to illustrate SGM's Bible editions.
