= Dorothy Wilkinson =

- Born: Dorothy Irene Wilkinson; 22 May 1883; Up Holland
- Died: 18 September 1947 (aged 64); Sydney's Neutral Bay
- Education: University of Melbourne
- Occupation: headteacher
- Employer: Sydney Church of England Girls Grammar School
- Predecessor: Edith Badham
- Successor: Barbara Chisholm

Dorothy Irene Wilkinson (22 May 1883 – 18 September 1947) was a United Kingdom-born Australian headmistress of Sydney Church of England Girls Grammar School.

== Life ==
Wilkinson was born in the English village of Up Holland. Her mother was Florence (born Shann) and her father, Reverend Christopher George Wilkinson, was to become the headmaster of Launceston Church Grammar School in Tasmania. Her father was invited to move to Tasmania by Bishop Henry Montgomery in 1899 - where he collected ancient stone tools. She was brought up there but she returned to England for her final school at the Clergy Daughters' School in Westmorland in 1896. The school had been the basis of the school in Charlotte Bronte's Jane Eyre some years before. Wilkinson returned to Tasmania and she did some teaching at her father's school. She qualified as a teacher at the University of Melbourne in 1912. In the following year she gained a degree in history.

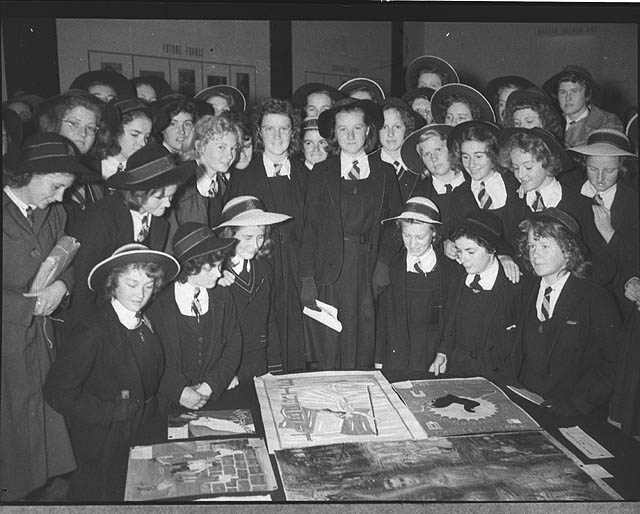
Some of her students in 1944

Edith Badham, the long-serving head of the Sydney Church of England Girls Grammar School in the Sydney suburb of Darlinghurst, died in 1920. She was succeeded by Wilkinson. She was awarded her masters degree by her alma mater in 1921. She gave the school a High Anglican and Christian ethos, and wrote the school chapel hymn as well as prayers and other hymns.

Wilkinson gave up being the honorary secretary of the Association of Headmistresses when she retired from the school in 1947 and she died later that year in Sydney's Neutral Bay, in an accident, when she fell while getting off a bus. She was succeeded by Barbara Chisholm. Her school has a portrait of her and, although now named SCEGGS Darlinghurst, "her" school was still in operation in 2024.
