= SCEGGS Darlinghurst =

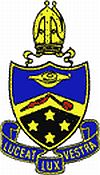

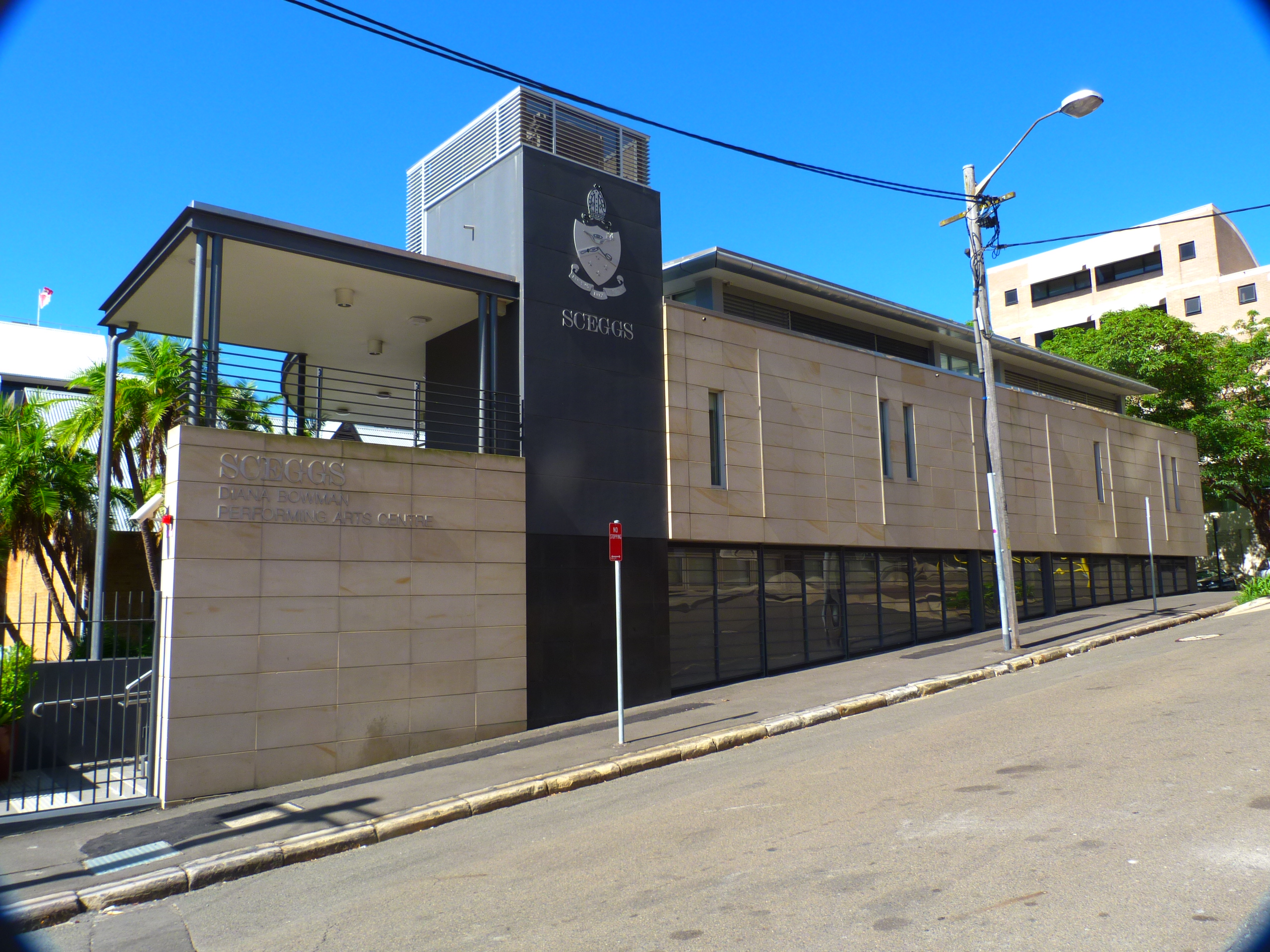
- Diana Bowman Performing Arts Centre at SCEGGS

Location
- 215 Forbes Street; Darlinghurst, New South Wales, 2010; Australia; 33°52′33″S 151°13′6″E

Information
- Former names: Sydney Church of England Girls Grammar School (1895–c. 1902); Sydney Church of England Girls' Grammar School, Darlinghurst (S.C.E.G.G.S.) (c. 1902–1976)
- Type: Independent single-sex primary and secondary day and boarding school
- Motto: Latin: Luceat Lux Vestra (Let Your Light Shine (Matthew 5:16))
- Denomination: Anglicanism
- Established: 1895; 131 years ago
- Founder: Edith Badham
- Educational authority: New South Wales Education Standards Authority
- Chairman: Sharon Cook
- Principal: Jenny Allum
- Staff: ~127
- Years: K–12
- Gender: Girls
- Enrolment: c. 900 (2019)
- Colours: Navy blue and white
- Nickname: SCEGGS
- Affiliations: Association of Heads of Independent Schools of Australia; Junior School Heads Association of Australia; Alliance of Girls' Schools Australasia; Association of Heads of Independent Girls' Schools
- Website: www.sceggs.nsw.edu.au

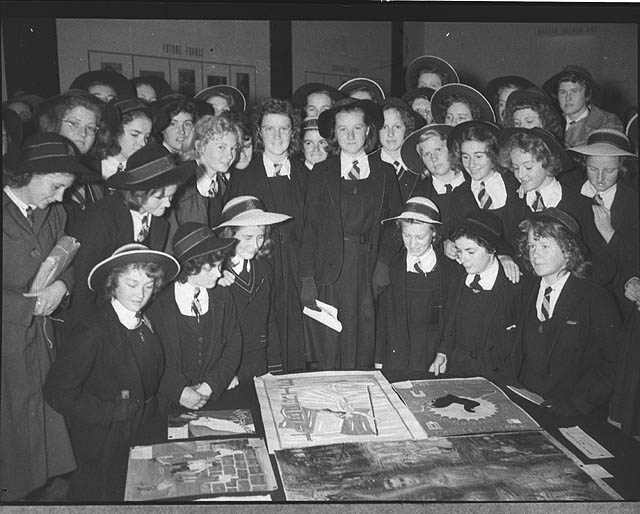
SCEGGS students at a French Exhibition at David Jones, 1944

SCEGGS Darlinghurst is an independent Anglican single-sex primary and secondary day and boarding school for girls, located in Darlinghurst, an inner-city, eastern suburb of Sydney, New South Wales, Australia.

Founded in 1895 as the Sydney Church of England Girls Grammar School, the school's official name was changed to SCEGGS Darlinghurst in 1995. The school has a non-selective enrolment policy and currently caters for approximately 890 students from Kindergarten to Year 12. The school is regularly among the top-performing schools in New South Wales academically. While predominantly a day school, SCEGGS offers a small number of boarding places at St Vincent's College, Potts Point.

SCEGGS is affiliated with the Association of Heads of Independent Schools of Australia (AHISA), the Junior School Heads Association of Australia (JSHAA), the Alliance of Girls' Schools Australasia (AGSA), and is a founding member of the Association of Heads of Independent Girls' Schools (AHIGS).

In 2001, The Sun-Herald ranked SCEGGS Darlinghurst second in Australia's top ten girls' schools, based on the number of its alumnae mentioned in the Who's Who in Australia (a listing of notable Australians).^{[a]}

== History ==
On 17 July 1895, a grammar school for girls was officially opened in Sydney under the auspices of the Sydney Diocese of the Church of England. The Sydney Church of England Girls' Grammar School (abbreviated as SCEGGS) commenced in a terrace house at 65 (now 55) Victoria Street, Darlinghurst with one pupil, Mary Watson, one teacher, Miss Janet Uther, and the Principal, Miss Edith Badham. Within a year, the school had increased to 50 pupils enrolled, and moved to "Chatsworth", a larger home in Macleay Street.

By 1900, the school had 100 pupils, including a Kindergarten and junior school. "Barham" in Forbes Street, Darlinghurst was purchased and the school moved there in 1901. The curriculum at the time included English Language and Literature, Geography, Modern and Ancient History, Latin, Classical Greek, Mathematics, French Language and Literature, German or Italian, Needlework and Drilling. Classes in Botany, Geology or other scientific subjects, were also offered to pupils who reached a fair standard of proficiency in their ordinary subjects. Classes in Cookery and Dressmaking were held whenever there was sufficient demand. In 1920 Dorothy Irene Wilkinson became the head following Edith Badham. Wilkinson made unsuccessful appeals for money from the church before she began an internal expansion of the school's facilities. The school roll grew to 365 pupils by 1935.

SCEGGS continued to expand and several branch schools were opened – Bowral (1906–1929) relocated to Moss Vale (1930–1974), Hunters Hill (1912–1915), North Sydney (1911–1941) becoming Redlands (1945–1976), Wollongong (1955–1976) and Loquat Valley (1967–1976).

In 1974, financial difficulties arose due to the controller of the Anglican Diocesan schools misappropriating school funds, threatening the school with closure. Within two years, contributions from the school community and the Sydney Diocese ensured that the original school, SCEGGS Darlinghurst, was not closed but continued to operate. Moss Vale was forced to close in 1974, and two years later, Redlands, Wollongong and Loquat Valley became schools independent from SCEGGS Darlinghurst, and have been governed by their own boards ever since.

A not-for-profit company limited by guarantee, SCEGGS Darlinghurst Limited, was formed in 1976, under a Board of Directors, to govern the school. On the school's Centenary in 1995, the school changed its name from Sydney Church of England Girls' Grammar School, Darlinghurst to SCEGGS Darlinghurst.

== Principals ==
Ordinal	Officeholder	Term start	Term end	Time in office	Notes
1	Edith Badham	1895	1920	24–25 years	
2	Dorothy Wilkinson	1920	1947	26–27 years	
3	Barbara Chisholm	1947	1977	29–30 years	
4	Diana Bowman	1978	1995	16–17 years	
5	Jenny Allum	1996	2025	29–30 years	
6	Holly Gyton	2026	incumbent	N/A	

== Campus ==
SCEGGS Darlinghurst has expanded from a terrace house in 1895 to a campus incorporating a chapel, primary school, classroom blocks, assembly hall, science and library block, auditorium, sports hall, senior study building, lecture theatre, play house, Great Hall and performing arts centre and many more. From 1965 to 1983, a preparatory school was operated at Bellevue Hill for boys and girls up to Kindergarten age. A new music centre has also been added, including a renovated church to be used for performances etc.

== Notable alumni ==
Media, entertainment and the arts

- Ethel Anderson – writer and painter
- Gillian Armstrong – film director
- Blanche d'Alpuget – biographer
- Anne Davies – Sydney Morning Herald journalist and MEAA identity
- Ursula Dubosarsky – author
- Susanne Gervay – author
- Claudia Karvan – actress
- Julie McCrossin – MC/comedian
- Enid Emily Moon – proofreader and copy editor
- Pamela Stephenson – comedian and therapist
- Zoe Terakes – actor
- Sarah Wynter – actor
- Yve Blake – screenwriter/playwright

Medicine and science

- Elizabeth Elliott AM – Professor of Paediatrics, Sydney University
- Joan Freeman – nuclear physicist, Rutherford Medal and Prize winner
- Tanya Monro – physicist, academic
- Vera Ramaciotti – philanthropist (established the Clive and Vera Ramaciotti Foundation for biomedical research)

Politics, public service and the law

- Virginia Bell – a Puisne Justice of the High Court of Australia, since 2009
- Liz Kernohan – Liberal politician
- Olive Kelso King – World War I ambulance driver
- Kay Patterson – Liberal senator and former health minister
- Esme Tombleson – Member of Parliament in New Zealand, and multiple sclerosis advocate
- Margaret Whitlam AO (née Dovey) – champion swimmer, social worker, wife of the 21st Prime Minister of Australia, Gough Whitlam, and a former Australian National Living Treasure

Business

- Sally Dominguez – Designer, Inventor
- Kirstin Ferguson – company director, Deputy Chair of Australian Broadcasting Corporation
- Roxy Jacenko – businesswoman

Sport

- Sienna Green (born 2004) – water polo Olympian
- Amy Parmenter – netballer
- Freda Du Faur – mountaineer, credited as the first woman to climb New Zealand's tallest mountain, Aoraki / Mount Cook

== See also ==
- Anglican education in Australia
- List of Anglican schools in New South Wales
- List of people educated at SCEGGS Darlinghurst
- Sydney Anglican Schools Corporation

== Notes ==
- Who's Who of girls' school rankings: 1. SCEGGS Darlinghurst 2. Ascham, 3. MLC Melbourne, 4. PLC Sydney, 5. Melbourne Girls Grammar School, 6.Mac.Robertson Girls' High School, 7. North Sydney Girls High School, 8.Sydney Girls High School, 9. MLC Sydney, 10. University High School, Melbourne
