= The Children's Friend (British magazine) =

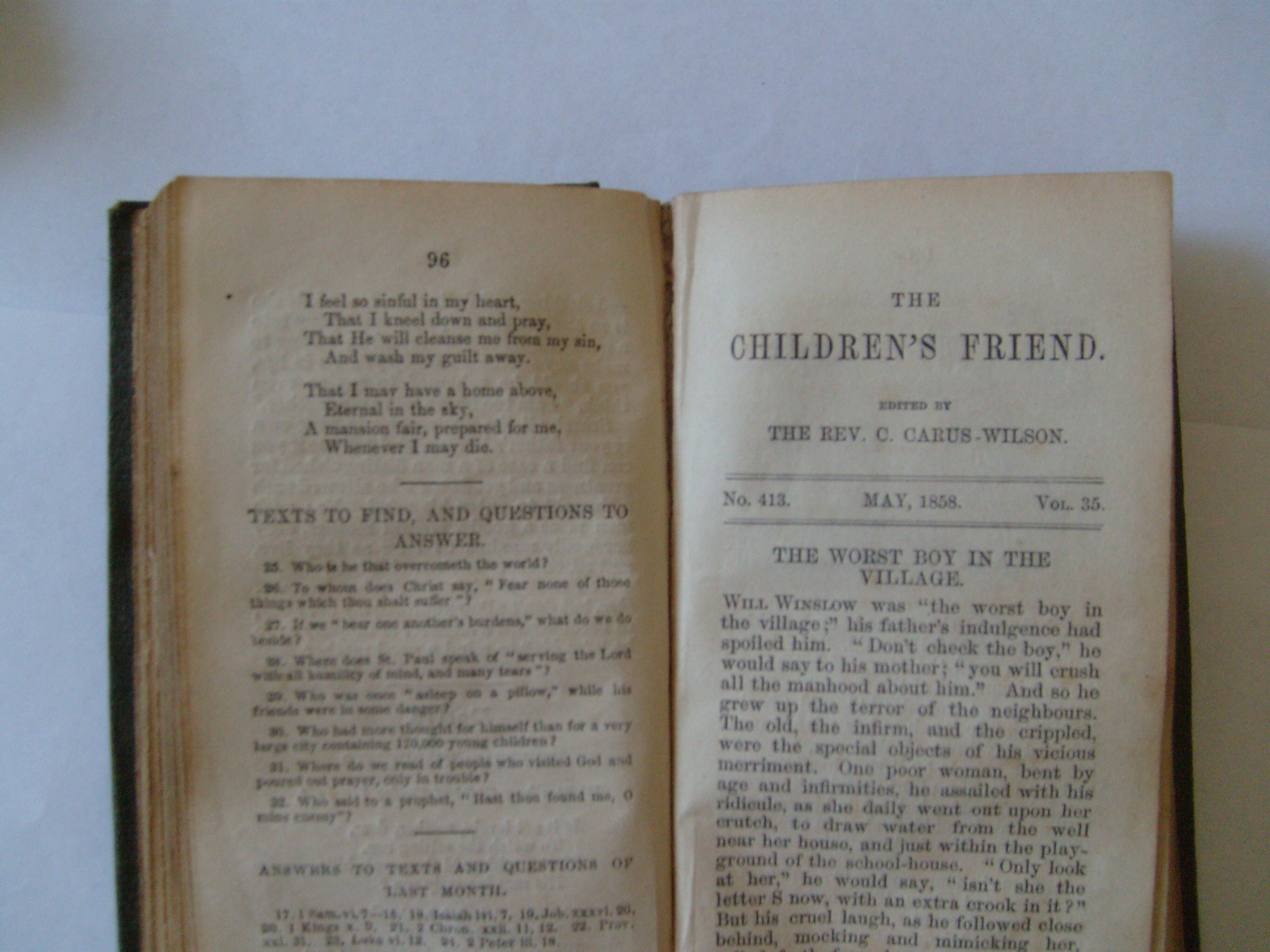
One of the last of the small format editions

A single issue – most now survive in bound annuals.

The Children's Friend was a British journal for children, in monthly parts, first published in 1824. It was founded by Rev. William Carus Wilson (1791–1859), who was based near Kirkby Lonsdale where the journal was initially printed. Carus Wilson is perhaps best known for being portrayed negatively as Mr Brocklehurst in Charlotte Brontë's Jane Eyre (1847).

Especially up to the turn of the century, The Children's Friend was essentially a religious work, promoting a "grim morality", and encouraging in its young audience the reading of the Bible, evangelism and charitable works. In its early years, it "inculcate[d] good behaviour by dire warnings of eternal damnation for children struck down by God, without time for repentance, as punishment for their sins." Gradually, more secular material was included. Succeeding editors included the founder's brother Rev. C. Carus Wilson, and William Francis Aitken.

William Carus Wilson's rationale for embarking on the publication of the journal was expressed to his young readers in the first edition:

For the last five years, I have sent out a monthly penny tract, called "THE FRIENDLY VISITOR." It was meant for young readers, as well as old ones; and I know that it has found its way very much into Sunday-schools, and into young hands in other places. But in the space of twelve pages, I have not found it easy, always to give what would suit all ages. Hence many friends have wished me to double both the size and the price of the Friendly Visitor. But I have thought it better to keep it as it is; and to publish a new work wholly for the young, which I call "THE CHILDREN'S FRIEND".

The price was still one penny in the 1860s, and it had sixteen pages.

The Children's Friend was published in two series, from 1824 to 1860 and from 1861 to 1930.

Some of the illustrations were made by Harrison Weir (1824–1906).
