= Casterton, Cumbria =

Coordinates: 54.211°N 2.575°W

Casterton
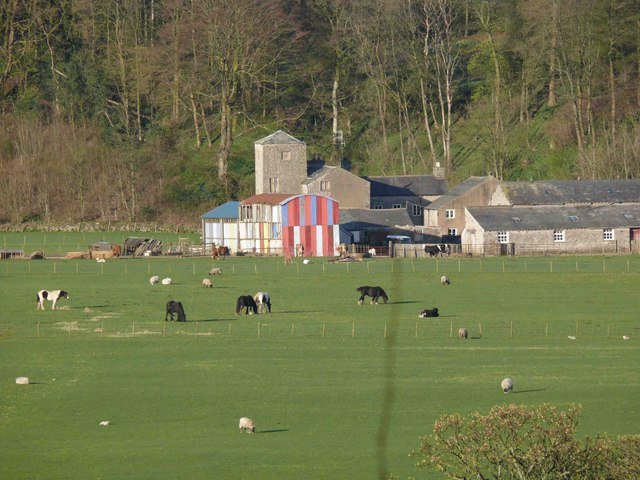
- Striped barn at Ruskin's View

- Location within Cumbria
- Population: 425 (2011)
- OS grid reference: SD6279
- Civil parish: Casterton
- Unitary authority: Westmorland and Furness
- Ceremonial county: Cumbria
- Region: North West
- Country: England
- Sovereign state: United Kingdom
- Post town: CARNFORTH
- Postcode district: LA6
- Dialling code: 01524
- Police: Cumbria
- Fire: Cumbria
- Ambulance: North West
- UK Parliament: Westmorland and Lonsdale

Casterton is a small village and civil parish close to Kirkby Lonsdale on the River Lune in the south east corner of Cumbria, England. In the 2001 census the parish had a population of 500, decreasing at the 2011 census to 425.

The parish is bounded by Kirkby Lonsdale, Barbon, Dent, Leck and Burrow-with-Burrow, and lies just inside the western edge of the Yorkshire Dales National Park: much of the Three Counties System, the longest explored natural cave system in the country, lies beneath it. The western boundary, towards Kirkby Lonsdale, is formed by the river and has one of the finest medieval bridges in the country, one of those known as Devil's Bridge and a local landmark.

== Casterton village ==
The village is situated approximately 5 miles (8.0 km) from junction 36 (Kendal and the Lakes exit) of the M6 motorway, near the intersection of the A65 Kendal to Leeds road, and the A683 which runs up the Lune valley from the port of Heysham to the market town of Kirkby Stephen.

The name of the village hints at a Roman camp, though no evidence of that has been found, but the major Roman Ribchester to Carlisle road runs to the east of the village and a cross-stone was ploughed up and reerected in the 19th century. A stone circle can be seen to the east, on top of a ridge on the flanks of Brownthwaite Pike.

The Ingleton Branch Line of the Lancaster and Carlisle Railway ran through the village before its closure under the Beeching axe in the mid-1960s.

The largest buildings in the village are at Casterton School, a private girls' school. The school was founded in 1820 by William Carus Wilson as a school for servants and teachers. Carus Wilson also founded the Clergy Daughters' School three years later at Cowan Bridge, Burrow-with-Burrow. The two schools were amalgamated on the present site in 1833. The Brontë sisters attended the Clergy Daughters' School on its original site and Lowood school in Jane Eyre is based on it.

Holy Trinity Church was also built under Carus Wilson. It was consecrated on 5 October 1833 by the Bishop of Chester. It was enlarged in 1865 and restored in 1891, and is at present run as part of the 'Rainbow Parish' based in Kirkby Lonsdale, a combination of eight, originally seven, churches.

Casterton has a private 9-hole golf course; an 18th-century coaching inn, The Pheasant Inn; a bus shelter for the weekly bus; and a phone box.

== Lee Child connection ==
One of the world's bestselling thriller writers, Lee Child, author and creator of Jack Reacher, discovered that his first novel had been accepted by a London literary agent during a pub quiz at the Pheasant Inn in Casterton.

In 1994, Jim Grant was a television executive, recently made redundant from Granada Television in Manchester, when he decided, out of financial necessity, to become a thriller writer. He was living at 10 Abbotsgate, just off Mitchelgate, in Kirkby Lonsdale, at the time, and his daughter Ruth was a pupil at the Queen Elizabeth School.

He chose the name 'Lee Child' as a pseudonym because it was short and would slip alphabetically between Raymond Chandler and Agatha Christie on bookstore shelves. He began writing his first novel with a modern knight errant as his hero, but he did not have a name for his character. Grant came up with the name 'Reacher' on a shopping trip to Asda supermarket in Kendal.

Grant's favoured watering hole was the Snooty Fox in the centre of Kirkby Lonsdale. Once a week he, his American wife Jane and friends would form a team in the pub quiz at the Pheasant Inn at nearby Casterton. It was at the Pheasant that he received an enthusiastic phone call from a London literary agent on Thursday, 7 December 1995.

== See also ==
- Listed buildings in Casterton, Cumbria
