= Enid Emily Moon =

Australian proofreader and copyeditor (1900–1999)

Enid Emily Moon (20 March 1900 – 10 October 1999) was an Australian proofreader and copy-editor who worked in the Australian publishing industry for more than 50 years. She is also the author of Memoirs of a Galley Slave: A Proof Reader Looks Back (1991).

== Early life ==
Moon was born in Sydney and was the daughter of Ernest Gillman Moon and his wife Lillias Holte (née Phillips). When Enid was born the family was living behind her father's dental offices on Macquarie Street. Early in her life they relocated first to Roseville, and then Moss Vale in the Southern Highlands. Owing to these moves Moon attended a number of schools and ultimately completed her schooling at Sydney Church of England Girls' Grammar School in Darlinghurst.

Moon would later recall of her early life that her father was a difficult man in that he was a disciplinarian. She stated that her childhood was characterised by an 'atmosphere of tension'.

Between 1918 and 1921 Moon studied education at the University of Sydney, but she never intended to work in a classroom. After graduation, she spent only one six-week period as a temporary fill-in teacher.

== Career ==
After deciding not to work as a teacher, Moon took a job as a proofreader at Building Ltd, a company that published numerous trade magazines. When she took on this job she knew very little about the role or the industry, and she learnt on the job. She worked closely under Florence Taylor, who managed the company alongside her husband George Taylor, and who was also one of Australia's first female architects. Moon would describe her as a 'very commanding lady'.

Later Moon changed roles and went to work, again as a proofreader, for Mosman Daily Ltd, which published free newspapers. In this role she was the only woman employed and was also able to learn about printing processes. She lost this job in 1930 following a car accident, which was likely caused by drink driving, in which she broke multiple bones. This was apparently only one of a series of similar incidents.

Owing to the Great Depression Moon struggled to find another job and was unemployed until 1932 when she found a position as a proofreader at Halstead Press, a subsidiary of Angus & Robertson. She also assisted with fact-checking and ensuring that the work did not contain libel or censored content. Standards were incredibly high; for each work, only three errors were allowed.

In this position she worked with a number of prominent Australian authors, including Frank Clune, Nino Culotta (the penname of John O'Grady), Eleanor Dark and Ion Idriess.

In 1957 Moon was promoted to copy-editor and worked in this role until her retirement in March 1972. Her retirement was due in part to Halstead going into decline as Australian printing moved offshore, which reduced demand for her work. In retirement, she took on freelance work until 1982.

== Personal life ==
Outside work, Moon was a bohemian and rebelled against conservative standards. She was opposed to marriage, stating that men were ‘all right to work with, be friends with and make love with’, but that she 'could not bear one around me twenty-four hours a day’.

She preferred instead to live alone.

== Later life and death ==
In later life Moon volunteered within her community and was a regular swimmer at Balmoral Beach.

In 1991, at the age of 91, she published Memoirs of a Galley Slave: A Proof Reader Looks Back, in which she recorded working conditions and gender relations in the printing industry between 1922 and 1972.

Another major work by Moon, which remained unpublished, was her autobiography, primarily about her younger life, entitled Myself When Young (1975). It is held, among other papers, by the State Library of New South Wales.

She died on 10 October 1999 at Lindfield.
