= Edith Badham =

(1853–1920) headmistress

- Portrait of Badham in 1903. Signed by herself.
- Born: Edith Annesley Badham; 6 December 1853; Louth, Lincolnshire
- Died: 17 May 1920 (aged 66); Mosman
- Resting place: St Thomas's Church of England cemetery, North Sydney
- Occupation: Headmistress
- Known for: Educator and headmistress of the Sydney Church of England Girls Grammar School (SCEGGS); Anti-suffragist
- Successor: Dorothy Irene Wilkinson
- Parents: Reverend Charles Badham (father); Julia Matilda Badham née Smith (mother)

Edith Annesley Badham (6 December 1853 – 17 May 1920) was an Australian educator and headmistress of the Sydney Church of England Girls Grammar School in Darlinghurst, New South Wales (a suburb of Sydney), now known as SCEGGS Darlinghurst.

== Early life ==
Badham was born in England in Louth, Lincolnshire. She was the oldest daughter of Reverend Charles Badham and his first wife, Julia Matilda (née Smith). She went to school in Dinant, France, where she was taught by her father, who recognised her gift for languages as a student.

In 1867, the family moved to Sydney, where her father was a Professor of Classics and Principal of the University of Sydney. Although women were not allowed to attend university, she studied all the subjects on the arts course and became so proficient that she helped her father in his work and corrected examination papers alongside him. In 1883–84, she looked after her brother's house in Tenterfield.

== Role as educator ==
Badham was very religious, and was a member of a provisional committee set up by the Church of England which was formed to establish a high school for girls under the aegis of the Church for a nominal salary amid a nationwide economic depression. The Sydney Church of England Girls Grammar School in Darlinghurst, New South Wales (a suburb of Sydney) was officially opened on 17 July 1895 in the presence of six bishops and with only one pupil.

Like her father, Edith saw education as a tool to develop discipline and strong character. In particular, she focused on the teaching of classical languages such as Latin and Greek; however, the curriculum also included a wide variety of courses. In an article in Cosmos Magazine written in April 1895, she condemned Australian literature as being inferior to classical European literature.

In 1896, the school moved to larger premises at Potts Point. A kindergarten was opened in 1900, and the school moved again to larger premises at Barham, Forbes Street. She became headmistress when branch schools were opened at Bowral in 1906 and North Sydney in 1911.

The school was registered with the Department of Public Instruction of New South Wales in 1914. However, in an annual prize-giving ceremony of that year, she said how she wanted to withdraw the school from the Department as she believed that the public school curriculum contained too many books for women to read.

Badham died in 1920. She was succeeded in the same year by Dorothy Irene Wilkinson.

== Personal views and writing ==
Badham's views on education and social thinking have been described as conservative; for example, she was an anti-suffragist (arguing against women's right to vote in The Brisbane Courier in 1895), and argued that motherhood and marriage were the highest developments of women's nature, a theme her schooling instilled into its pupils. Her views were widely held by the population at large, and her school flourished.

== Bibliography ==
- A Trip to Java (1909)
- Java Revisited and Malaya (1912)
