= Cowan Bridge School =

School in Lancashire, England

Coordinates: 54.1841°N 2.5621°W

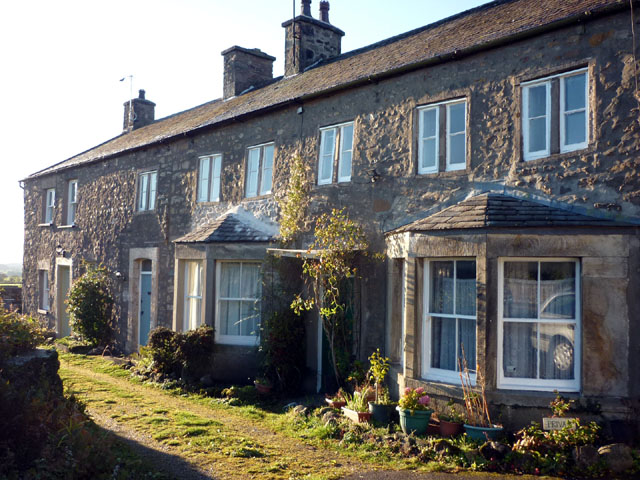
- The former school building at Cowan Bridge
- Cowan Bridge, Lancashire; England

Information
- Established: 1824
- Founder: William Carus Wilson
- Gender: Girls
- Alumni: The Brontë sisters

The Cowan Bridge School was a Clergy Daughters' School, founded in 1824, at Cowan Bridge in the English county of Lancashire. It was mainly for the daughters of middle class clergy and attended by the Brontë sisters. In the 1830s it moved to Casterton, Cumbria, a few miles away.

== History ==
Cowan Bridge School was a Clergy Daughters' School, founded and purchased in 1824 by William Carus Wilson. The old part of the school consisted of one house which housed the teachers. He added a building for a school and student dormitories. It was a school mainly for the daughters of middle class clergy. It was first located in the village of Cowan Bridge in Lancashire, where it was attended by the Brontë sisters. The two eldest sisters, Maria and Elizabeth died from tuberculosis in 1825 in the aftermath of a typhoid outbreak at the school.

In the 1830s the school moved to Casterton, a few miles away, where it was amalgamated with another girls' school. The later headmistress Dorothy Wilkinson travelled from Tasmania as a girl to attend in 1896. The institution survived to the twenty-first century as Casterton School.

The building is now known as Bronte Cottages and has been divided into three cottages.

== Conditions ==
The Cowan Bridge school imposed a uniform on the children known as the charity children, which humiliated the Brontës, who were among the youngest of the boarders. They suffered taunting from the older children, Charlotte Brontë especially, who, owing to her short-sightedness, had to hold her nose close to the paper to be able to read or write. They slept two in a bed with their heads propped up, rising before dawn, making their morning ablutions in a basin of cold water (shared with six other pupils) which had often frozen during the night due to the lack of heating. They descended for an hour and a half of prayers before breakfasting on porridge, frequently burnt.

== Charlotte Brontë's description ==
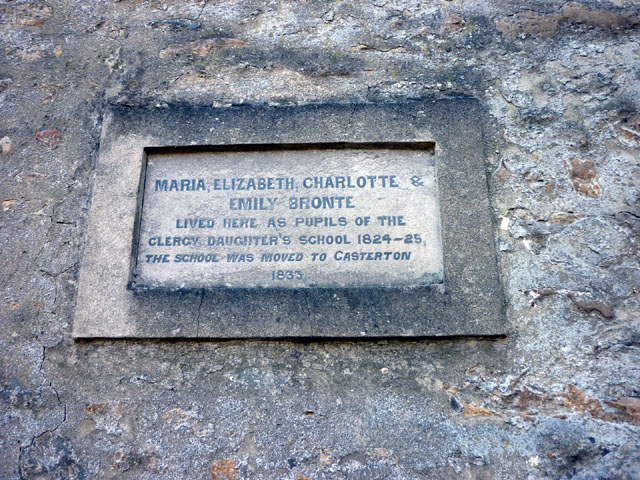
A dedication plaque on the building.

Charlotte Brontë's description in her 1847 novel Jane Eyre was similar, with burnt porridge and frozen water. They began their lessons at half past nine, ending at noon, followed by recreation in the garden until dinner, a meal taken very early. Lessons began again without pause until 5 p.m., when there was a short break for half a slice of bread and a small bowl of coffee and 30 minutes of recreation, followed by another long period of study. The day ended with a glass of water, an oatcake, and evening prayers before bed. Punishments included deprivation of food and recreation, corporal punishment, and humiliations such as being made to sit on a stool for hours on end without moving, wearing a dunce's cap.

The punishment is described in Jane Eyre, and reports by Mrs Gaskell confirm this ill-treatment. Furthermore, when Mr Williams, reader at Smith, Elder & Co, congratulated her for the narrative vigour of her description, Charlotte Brontë, unusually vehemently, insisted that it was true, and that furthermore she had deliberately avoided telling everything so as not to be accused of exaggeration. It is difficult to think that Charlotte Brontë, having persistently repeated for twenty years the stories about the bad treatment inflicted on her sisters, could have exaggerated or invented them. For example, there is the description, given by an unidentified witness to Mrs Gaskell, of the little Maria who, very ill and having just received a suction cup placed on her right side by the doctor, rose suddenly on seeing Miss Andrews enter the room, and began to get dressed. Before she could slip into some clothing, the mistress pulled her violently into the centre of the room, scolding her for negligence and disorder, and punished her for being late, upon which Maria descended from the dormitory although she could hardly stand up. According to Mrs Gaskell, the witness spoke as if she saw it yet, and her whole face flashed out undying indignation.

The hardest days were Sundays. In all weather, without adequate protective clothing, the pupils had to walk more than three miles (five km) over the fields to St John the Baptist's Church, Tunstall, to attend the Sunday service. As the distance did not permit a return to the school, they were given a cold snack at the back of the church before evensong, then finally walked back to school. On arriving, cold and famished after the long walk, they were given a single slice of bread spread with rancid butter. Their Sunday devotions ended with long recitations from the catechism, learning long biblical texts by heart, and hearing a sermon whose main theme was often eternal damnation. The Revd. Carus Wilson, unlike Patrick Brontë, was a Calvinist Evangelist who believed in predestination, and consequently in the damnation of the majority of souls. His preachings and writings, in the form of small manuals for the use of the pupils, were full of rhetorical force and other effects designed to make an impression on their young readers' minds.

== Sources ==
- Smith Kenyon, Karen (April 2002). The Brontë Family: Passionate Literary Geniuses. Lerner Publications. ISBN 0-8225-0071-X.
