= Cecil Carus-Wilson =

British politician

Mayor of Twickenham
- In office ?–?

Personal details
- Born: 18 October 1857; Weston-super-Mare, England
- Died: 24 September 1934 (aged 76); Bristol, England
- Relatives: William Carus Wilson (grandfather)

Cecil Carus-Wilson JP FRSE FGS FRGS (18 October 1857–24 September 1934) was a 20th-century British local politician who served as Mayor of Twickenham but who is remembered as an amateur geologist.

He specialised in the acoustic properties of rocks.

== Life ==
He was born in Weston-super-Mare on 18 October 1857, the 5th son of 11 children of Rev William Carus-Wilson (1822–1883) and his wife, Mary Letablere Litton. He was grandson of Rev William Carus Wilson.

He was elected a Fellow of the Royal Society of Edinburgh in 1898 for his contributions to geology. His proposers were Robert Etheridge, Sir William Abbott Herdman, Hugh Robert Mill and Peter Guthrie Tait. He was also a Member of the British Association for the Advancement of Science, and President of the Twickenham Literary and Scientific Society.

In 1911 he inherited Casterton Hall in Westmorland from his elder brother Rev William Carus-Wilson (1845–1911).

In 1929 he was living at "Altmore" in Waldegrave Park, Strawberry Hill in Twickenham.

He died in Bristol on 24 September 1934.

== Publications ==
- Musical Sand (1888)
- The Works of Archibald Geikie (1890)
- Floating Stones (1900)
- Super-Cooled Rain Drops (1905)
- Sounding Stones (1906)
- The Pitting of Flint Surfaces (1909)

== Family ==
He married Barbara Julia Chalk (1863–1934). He was father to Cecil Caradoc Carus-Wilson (b.1892) who served as a Captain in the First World War.
