= Burrow-with-Burrow =

Civil parish in Lancashire, England

Coordinates: 54.175°N 2.589°W

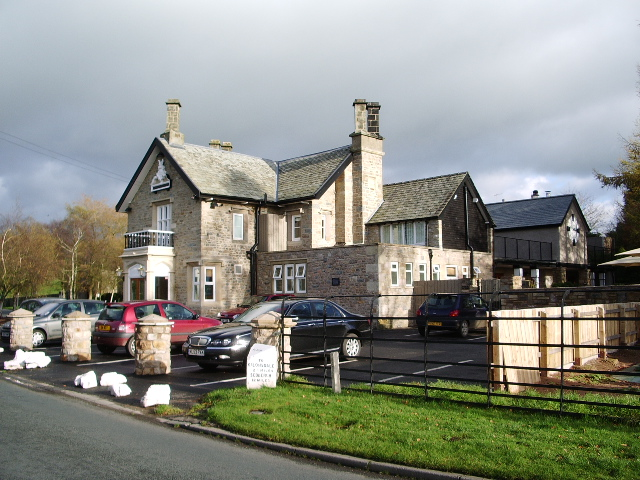
- The Highwayman, Nether Burrow

- Location in the City of Lancaster district Location within Lancashire
- Population: 182 (2011)
- OS grid reference: SD616756
- Civil parish: Burrow-with-Burrow
- District: Lancaster
- Shire county: Lancashire
- Region: North West
- Country: England
- Sovereign state: United Kingdom
- Post town: CARNFORTH
- Postcode district: LA6
- Dialling code: 01524
- Police: Lancashire
- Fire: Lancashire
- Ambulance: North West
- UK Parliament: Morecambe and Lunesdale

Burrow-with-Burrow is a civil parish in the English county of Lancashire. The parish of Burrow-with-Burrow had a population of 191 recorded in the 2001 census, decreasing to 182 at the 2011 Census.

It is on the River Lune 2 miles (3.2 km) south of the Cumbrian town Kirkby Lonsdale. Administratively it forms part of the City of Lancaster, Lancaster itself being some 17 miles (27 km) away.

Settlements in the parish include Nether Burrow, Over Burrow, Overtown and Cowan Bridge.

The parish is sometimes referred to as "Burrow" for brevity.

== History ==
Roman pavements, altars, inscriptions, urns, and coins have been found here; and a Roman milestone is on the road.

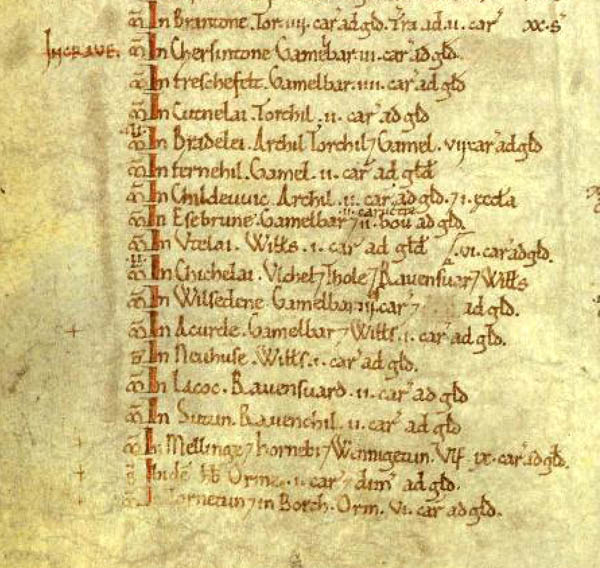
The Domesday Book folio 301v includes the arable land in Burrow-with-Burrow

In 1086, the Domesday Book listed under Craven: Torntun & in Borch, Orm vi curactes ad geld. (Thornton-in-Lonsdale with Burrow-with-Burrow Orm has c720 acres /290ha of plough-land to be taxed.) That manor would also have included grazing land but since only arable land was tallied the total area can only be induced. Orm was one of the family of Norse Noblemen who held the most land in Northern England.

Burrow Hall is a large 18th-century country house set in an estate to the north of the village.

== See also ==
- Listed buildings in Burrow-with-Burrow
