= Nether Burrow =

Hamlet in Lancashire, England

Coordinates: 54.171°N 2.592°W

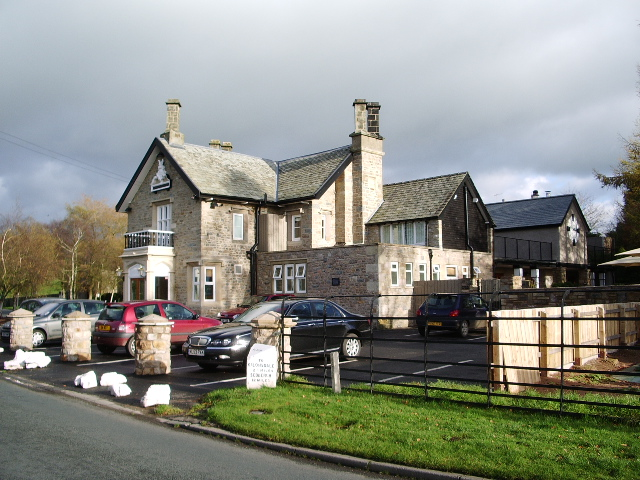
- The Highwayman public house

- Location in the City of Lancaster district Location within Lancashire
- OS grid reference: SD613512
- Civil parish: Burrow-with-Burrow
- District: City of Lancaster
- Shire county: Lancashire
- Region: North West
- Country: England
- Sovereign state: United Kingdom
- Post town: CARNFORTH
- Postcode district: LA6
- Dialling code: 015242
- Police: Lancashire
- Fire: Lancashire
- Ambulance: North West
- UK Parliament: Morecambe and Lunesdale

Nether Burrow is a small hamlet in the Lunesdale Valley of North Lancashire, England. It is a small settlement on the banks of the River Lune. There is not much there but there is a pub called the Highwayman Inn. It is on the A683 road between Lancaster and Kirkby Lonsdale. It forms part of the civil parish of Burrow-with-Burrow, in the Lancaster district.
