= William Carus Wilson =

English writer (1791–1859)

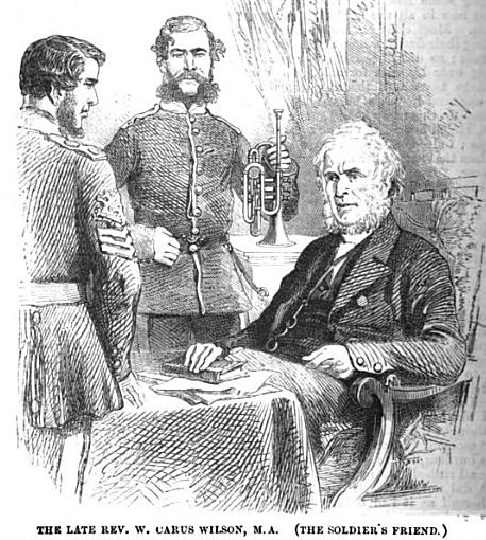
William Carus Wilson (seated), from The Children's Friend, 1864

William Carus Wilson (Note: While his family is often collectively referred to as the Carus-Wilson family, the reverend himself usually appears in records and publications without the hyphen. The Oxford Dictionary of National Biography and The Canterbury Dictionary of Hymnology list him as William Carus Wilson, while most of his own published works, such as The Children's Friend, list him as W. Carus Wilson.) (7 July 1791 – 30 December 1859) was an English churchman and the founder and editor of the long-lived monthly The Children's Friend. He was the inspiration for Mr Brocklehurst, the autocratic head of Lowood School, depicted by Charlotte Brontë in her 1847 novel Jane Eyre.

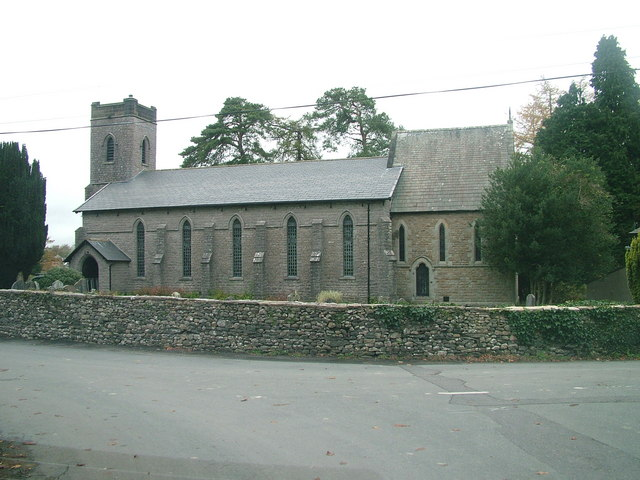
Holy Trinity Church, founded by Carus Wilson and the site of his burial

== Early life ==
He was born at Heversham as William Carus. While he was a child his father (also called William) inherited an estate at Casterton, near Kirkby Lonsdale in Westmorland and took on the surname Wilson (which was a condition of the bequest). His father served as one of Cockermouth's two MPs in the 1820s.

He was educated at Trinity College, Cambridge, graduating B.A. in 1815. Although refused orders that year owing to his excessive Calvinism, he was ordained the following year and returned to the Lune valley, becoming Vicar of Tunstall, a small village in Lancashire. Some years later he became Rector of Whittington on the other side of the River Lune and was succeeded by Henry Currer Wilson at Tunstall. He founded Holy Trinity Church, Casterton, in the early 1830s, donating the land on which it stands. He was also chaplain to The Prince Augustus Frederick.

== The Clergy Daughters' School, "Mr Brocklehurst" and Charlotte Brontë ==
In 1823 he established at Cowan Bridge the Clergy Daughters' School for low-cost education of daughters of poorer members of the clergy. The fees were very low, subsidised by donations made by Carus Wilson and others. Its patron was the Archbishop of York and its President was the Bishop of Chester, and one of the benefactors was the slavery abolitionist William Wilberforce. It was intended to assist "Clergymen with limited incomes, in the education of their children". (This school later moved to Casterton where it continued as the independent Casterton School, and subsequently (from 2013) the preparatory department of Sedbergh School. One of Sedbergh School's three girls' houses is named Carus after Carus Wilson, following the arrival of pupils from Casterton Senior School.)

The author Charlotte Brontë was a pupil at Cowan Bridge in 1824/25 and attended Sunday services at Tunstall church. She featured the school in Jane Eyre as "Lowood". She based her character Robert Brocklehurst on Carus Wilson. Brocklehurst is presented as a hypocrite:

He attests to his morality and charity and that all men, and especially young girls should be brought up in a way that teaches them humility and respect for their betters and he uses God and the Bible to make his points. He threatens his "wards" with hell and damnation if they don't walk the line that he pretends to walk himself... his charitable actions are no more than a cover for what he believes will get him into heaven and a means to promote his superiority, his family and their wealth. (Suzanne Hesse)

In the year of Jane Eyre's publication Carus Wilson reportedly took legal advice with a view to suing for defamation, but desisted on receiving a letter of explanation and apology from the author. However, the novel was published as the work of the pseudonymous Currer Bell, and it is not clear how many of the first readers of the book would have been in a position to make the connection between Lowood and Carus Wilson's foundation. In a letter to her publisher W.S. Williams, Charlotte describes overhearing an elderly clergyman talk about reading Jane Eyre and saying "Why, they have got Cowan Bridge School, and Mr. Wilson here, I declare! and Miss Evans." She says, "He had known them all. I wondered whether he would recognise the portraits, and was gratified to find that he did, and that, moreover, he pronounced them faithful and just. He said, too, that Mr. Wilson 'deserved the chastisement he had got.'" The connection between Lowood and the Clergy Daughters' School was made explicit in The Life of Charlotte Brontë published in 1857 after Brontë's death. The following year Carus Wilson's son William Wilson Carus-Wilson wrote his 20-page Refutation of the Statements in 'The Life of Charlotte Bronte'

== Publications ==
Carus Wilson established and edited The Friendly Visitor (in 1819) and most notably The Children's Friend, "the first penny periodicals that ever appeared in England of the kind". The latter, which he founded in 1824, was to long survive him, ceasing publication in 1930.

Carus Wilson addressed the high mortality rate and perceived sinfulness of his youthful readers, often describing the deaths of pious children as examples to emulate. He also wrote of the consequences of children's disobedient behaviour, as in his Child's First Tales (1829?): "In the tale, ‘Dead Boy’, for example, Little Ben is too distracted to pray. When he goes skating on a pond on Sunday, he falls through the ice and dies! In another story, a little girl has such a dreadful tantrum that ‘God struck her dead. She fell down on the floor and died’. The children who are meek and obedient are rewarded."

He was the author of a number of other religious works, including copies of his sermons. He even published on the subject of architecture: given that he included elevations it has been suggested that he had some specialist help from George Webster, the presumed architect of the church at Casterton.

== Mission to soldiers and later life ==
As the eldest surviving child, he late in life inherited the family estates, following his father's death in 1851.

An article about Carus Wilson that appeared some years after his death in The Children's Friend celebrated his efforts in later life to address drunkenness among British soldiers through personal visits to barracks and the distribution of tracts by mail. "He invited soldiers to regard him as their friend, and consult him when needing advice." He also provided Bibles to French soldiers who fought in the Crimean War.

In retirement, he was a Lecturer at St. John's Church, Newport, Isle of Wight. In this church there is a marble monument to his memory, with the inscription: "Erected by the Non-commissioned Officers and Privates of the British Army in token of their love and gratitude." It depicts a weeping soldier reading his Bible. There is also a memorial to him at Holy Trinity Church, Casterton, where he is buried.

== Family ==
Carus Wilson was one of ten children, born to evangelical parents. His brother Edward (1795–1860) was also a churchman. In 1815 he married Anne Neville (who died a month before him), the daughter of Major-General Charles Neville. He had seven sons and six daughters; twelve of these thirteen are recorded as surviving into adulthood.

His many grandchildren include the geologist Cecil Carus-Wilson.
