= Cowan Bridge =

Coordinates: 54.182°N 2.560°W

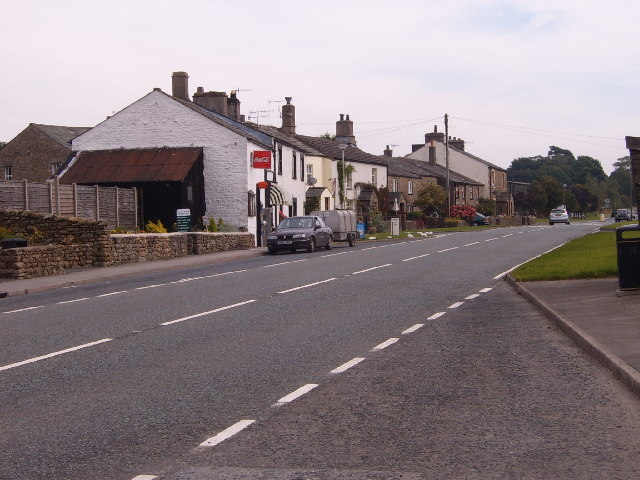
- Cowan Bridge

- Location in the City of Lancaster district Location within Lancashire
- OS grid reference: SD634765
- Civil parish: Leck; Burrow-with-Burrow
- District: City of Lancaster
- Shire county: Lancashire
- Region: North West
- Country: England
- Sovereign state: United Kingdom
- Post town: CARNFORTH
- Postcode district: LA6
- Dialling code: 015242
- Police: Lancashire
- Fire: Lancashire
- Ambulance: North West
- UK Parliament: Morecambe and Lunesdale

Cowan Bridge is a village in the English county of Lancashire.

It is south-east of the town of Kirkby Lonsdale where the main A65 road crosses the Leck Beck. It forms part of the civil parish of Burrow-with-Burrow.

== Clergy Daughters' School ==
Cowan Bridge was the site of the Clergy Daughters' School attended by Charlotte and Emily Brontë, the notable 19th-century writers, and their older sisters Maria and Elizabeth, who died after experiencing harsh privations at the school. There is a plaque commemorating this association on the former school building, which partially survives. The churchyard of St Peter's Church, Leck, has graves of several of the children who died at the school.

Charlotte described the abuses, the typhus epidemic in which seven pupils died, the scandal which followed, and subsequent reform of the school in Jane Eyre. The character of Helen Burns is based closely on Maria. Reverend Brocklehurst is a portrait of William Carus Wilson, who managed the school in the Brontës' time. Women readers who had attended the school confirmed Charlotte's account.

In a letter to her publisher W.S. Williams, Charlotte describes overhearing an elderly clergyman talk about reading Jane Eyre and saying "Why, they have got Cowan Bridge School, and Mr. Wilson here, I declare! and Miss Evans." She says, "He had known them all. I wondered whether he would recognise the portraits, and was gratified to find that he did, and that, moreover, he pronounced them faithful and just. He said, too, that Mr. Wilson 'deserved the chastisement he had got.'"

The Clergy Daughters' School still exists. It was moved to Casterton shortly after the scandal. In 1840 another typhus epidemic struck 70 of the pupils, claiming the lives of three. By 1857 Dorothea Beale was teaching there. It was apparent to her that while some of the physical circumstances had improved since Charlotte's time, the spiritual aspects had not changed. When the Life of Charlotte Brontë by Elizabeth Gaskell came out, Beale began to write her own unfavorable impressions of the religious education handed out there.
