= John Kingston (publisher) =

English publisher & minister (1769–1824)

John Kingston (1769 – 24 April 1824), was originally a Methodist minister. He married Jane Branwell, a sister of Maria Branwell. John was expelled from the Methodist movement in 1807 for misdemeanours. He then emigrated to the United States with his family and settled at Baltimore, running a book and stationery store. He also became an author and publisher. John died in New York.

== Family and early life ==
John was born in Towcester, Northamptonshire, England, in 1769. He was a son of Thomas Kingston, who was a Staymaker, (Note: In 1773 Thomas Kingston of Towcester was listed as a Staymaker, and had an apprentice named John Jackson.) and his wife Ann (maiden surname of Osborn or Osborne), who married at Towcester on 30 October 1758. At the time he was born, he had four older sisters, and two older brothers. John was baptised at Towcester on 21 April 1769.

John joined the Methodist movement from the age of sixteen, when he left all his old companions, and began to associate "with persons of a religious character." His parents were alarmed at this change at first. But John reassured them, by telling them that he had "only forsaken the mad and frantic ways of an evil world." He believed that by being determined to seek the Lord and serve him, this would strengthen filial affection rather than weaken it.

== Methodist ministry ==
He moved to London, and joined the London Methodist circuit in 1789, staying at the home of Mr. E. Collinson, a head of a family who gave residence to Methodist missionaries. He increased his knowledge and experience in the ministry of John Wesley during the last two years of Wesley's life. John Kingston preached in Workhouses in London.

=== Overseas missionary work (1791–98) ===
John was present at the Methodist conference in Manchester, England, which took place on 26 July 1791. While at this conference, he met Thomas Coke (bishop), and soon after this Thomas invited John Kingston to go to the West Indies and become a missionary there. John left London on 18 October 1791, with another preacher named Pattison and headed for Falmouth, Cornwall. They sailed on 27 October from Falmouth, on board the Dashwood Packet, and anchored in Carlisle Bay, Barbados, on 26 November.

He was appointed as minister for Barbados, and preached his last sermon there on 6 January 1793. He was then appointed as the minister for Nevis, and arrived there on 22 February. In May and June 1793, there was an outbreak of Yellow fever in Saint Vincent and the Grenadines, and Dominica. This killed many people, including Rev. Mr. Dent, of St. George's, Grenada. John Kingston became ill with Yellow fever, on 13 August 1793, the day after a hurricane had struck the island of Nevis. He recovered slightly but then got worse.

So John then decided to recuperate in the United States and sailed on the brig Neptune, with John Harper from Sint Eustatius. They sailed to Kennebunkport, Maine, and from there, sailed to Boston where they were received by Mr. Baurells. Because he did not seem to be getting any better, John wished to sail back to England, where he wanted to die, but could not find a ship at the time that was bound for Europe. So he then stayed at the home of Mr. Johnson in Lynn, Massachusetts, for a few months. His strength recovered, and John was able to ride his horse a few miles. He attended the Methodist Conference in July 1795 where John met Francis Asbury, and was appointed for New York, which he reached on 26 July. John Kingston was in New York at the time Yellow fever broke out. Up to 80 people a day were being buried due to the disease. Shops were closed, and many people wanted to travel away from the city.

He left New York on 4 October 1795, and went to Philadelphia. John preached to a large congregation at Christ Church, Philadelphia. Also in this same church, in October 1795 he saw George Washington, and his wife Martha.

John travelled to Baltimore on 23 October 1795, where he met Francis Asbury. After a few weeks, Francis wanted him to go to Charles Town, South Carolina, for the Winter. But because of the death of Mr. William Jessop, a preacher of the Baltimore circuit, John Kingston supplied his place there until the following Spring.

He left the United States on 10 April 1796, on board the William, and headed for the island of Saint Kitts. He arrived at Saint Kitts after twenty three days and then was appointed to Dominica, reaching there on 26 May 1796 with a Mr. Baxter, a fellow missionary. They were received with politeness on their arrival by the Governor of Dominica, Henry Hamilton (colonial administrator). On 17 October 1796, he was summoned by Colonel Metcalf, of the St. George's Regiment, to appear in the field as a soldier the following Sunday morning. John petitioned to be excused because this was the day he was employed in the duties of religious worship. But this petition was treated with contempt by the President, and John was told to leave the island. He arrived at Saint Vincent on 6 November 1796. On 21 January 1797, John was appointed to Grenada, supplying the place of Mr. Hallett, who at this time was ill. Mr. Hallett recovered, and so John Kingston went to Saint Vincent's in June 1797.

=== Return to England ===
He arrived back in Grenada by 1 February 1798. On 7 May 1798, John Kingston sailed back to England from Grenada on board the Cotton Planter, with Mr. Richard Pattison, reaching Portsmouth on 1 July. John then went to London and met friends there. After spending a few days with his parents, John travelled to Bristol, and was present at the Methodist Conference on 30 July 1798, when he was appointed to the Carmarthen circuit.

John was on the Carmarthen circuit for one year. He attended the Methodist Conference at Manchester, on July the 29th 1799 and was then appointed to the Penzance circuit in Cornwall alongside Thomas Longley, William Pearson, and John Reynolds junior.

=== Marriage ===
While in Penzance, John Kingston met Jane Branwell. Jane was a sister of Maria Branwell. They were married at St Maddern's Church, Madron, by licence on 12 June 1800. It was witnessed by Thomas Longley, a preacher on the Wesleyan circuit of Penzance, and Elizabeth Branwell, who was Jane's sister. At the time of marriage, John Kingston was thirty one years old, and Jane Branwell was twenty seven.

=== Children born in England (1801-1807) ===
John Kingston and his wife at first lived at St Austell. Their first child, Thomas Branwell Kingston was baptised there on 1 April 1801. He was assigned to Truro, after the 1801 Methodist Conference, held at Leeds on 27 July 1801. In the following year, John was assigned to Launceston, Cornwall, and his daughter Anne Branwell Kingston was born there on 15 May 1803. John baptised Anne himself at the Church in Launceston, on 12 June 1803.

In July 1803, John was assigned to the Nottingham circuit where his son John was born and baptised in 1804. A stipple engraving portrait was made of John when he was 35 years old. Following the 1805 Methodist Conference, John Kingston was assigned to Shrewsbury, (Note: This is just 13 miles from Wellington, Shropshire. In 1806, John Fennell, an uncle of John Kingston's wife, (in 1790 John Fennell married Jane Branwell, a sister of Thomas) left Penzance to take up the position as the head of a boarding school in Wellington, and a role as a preacher at the Wesleyan chapel there. He was a godson of John William Fletcher, and born in Madeley, Shropshire in 1762. He set up a writing school at Penzance which opened around 1792. Prior to this he had been an assistant schoolmaster. John was an evangelical, but not a Methodist minister. He became part of the Madeley Circle, when arriving at Wellington in 1806: People who took inspiration from Mary Fletcher, of Madeley, John William Fletcher's widow. Others in this circle included William Morgan (1782–1858) (John Fennell's future son in-law), and when he became curate of Wellington in 1809, Patrick Brontë. Patrick's former college friend from St. John's College, Cambridge, was Rev. John Nunn. John was the curate of St. Chad's Shrewsbury at the time when John Kingston was assigned to Shrewsbury. John was still holding that post when Patrick arrived at nearby Wellington in 1809, and the two became re-acquainted. Patrick and John Fennell became friends for life. John Fennell was invited by Mary Fletcher to become the first Headmaster of Woodhouse Grove School, which opened in January 1812, for the sons of Methodist ministers. Patrick Brontë became an examiner for this school in 1812. He first met Maria Branwell there, who was assisting her aunt and uncle, and they married at Guiseley, on 29 December 1812. It is not known if John Kingston himself was a part of the Madeley Circle. But he was certainly known by Mary Fletcher, and did spend time in Fletcher's study at Madeley.) where his daughter Maria Ann Kingston was born in 1807.

=== Wesleyan trial ===
John Kingston was called to a Wesleyan trial at Birmingham, England, on 1 July 1807. He was accused and found guilty of taking money from the book fund during his time as Wesleyan superintendent minister of Shrewsbury. He was also found guilty of "improper behaviour towards two young men." John was suspended until the annual Methodist Conference at Liverpool, on 27 July 1807, when it was announced that he had been formally expelled from the Methodist movement.

== Emigration to the United States ==
John Kingston emigrated to the United States before the end of 1807, taking his pregnant wife and four children to Baltimore, Maryland. John set up a publishing business and ran a stationery and book store. This store was at 164, Market Street, Baltimore. His child Elizabeth (sometimes known as Eliza) Jane Kingston, was born in the Summer of 1808 at Baltimore.

Due to a combination of an unhappy marriage, and the climate in the United States, which was not to her liking, Jane separated from John Kingston taking her youngest daughter Elizabeth, then ten months old with her. They left for New York, on the 25th of April 1809 to sail back to England. (Note: Jane's trials and tribulations with her husband John Kingston, and the story of her leaving him, would have been known to her sisters Maria Branwell, and Elizabeth Branwell. Jane's actions in leaving her husband John Kingston, and taking her youngest child with her, have been said to have resembled part of the plot of Helen, the protagonist of the novel The Tenant of Wildfell Hall, written by Jane's niece Anne Brontë, in 1848. In the novel The Tenant of Wildfell Hall, Helen escapes from her husband, taking her child with her, and was helped by a sibling. Jane had left her husband, taking her youngest child with her and went to Penzance, to live near the Branwell house at Chapel Street. It has been argued that Jane, Anne Brontë's maternal aunt, was a prototype for Helen in The Tenant of Wildfell Hall, because she refused to stay with a husband who threatened her future, and also her child's future. And in doing so, it defied conventional norms. At the time this would have been seen by some as a scandalous action. But Jane was accepted and supported by her sister Elizabeth Branwell. In her Will written in 1833, at Haworth, she bequeathed money to her sister Jane Kingston, and Jane's daughter Elizabeth Jane Kingston. Elizabeth Branwell also bequeathed money to her nieces Charlotte Brontë, Emily Brontë, and Anne Brontë. Elizabeth Branwell died in 1842. Jane Kingston (formerly Branwell) died in Penzance in 1855, aged 81. She was buried at St Maddern's Church, Madron, on 12 May 1855.)John Kingston sewed a lock of Elizabeth's hair to a piece of paper, with a note marking the date. It was made possible for Jane to be able to leave John Kingston, due to an annuity of fifty pounds a year, from different property rents left to her from her father Thomas Branwell's will written on 26 March 1808. In this will it stipulated that this annuity was not to be at the disposal or control of her husband, but only for her own disposal. Thomas Branwell had died in April 1808 at Penzance. Jane and her youngest daughter went to Penzance to live. Her four older children stayed in the United States with John Kingston.

== Later years ==
John Kingston published his first book, The Reader's Cabinet, in 1809. In 1810 he was the author and publisher of The New American Biographic Dictionary Or, Memoirs of Many of the Most Eminent Persons that Have Ever Lived in this Or Any Other Nation. He was also the author and publisher of a pocket version of this dictionary, the second edition of which was printed in 1811. In the same year he published The New American Hymn Book. Two years later, John Kingston was the writer and publisher of a biography of George Washington.

He became a citizen of the United States in 1814.

From John Kingston's time on the Shrewsbury Methodist circuit after 1805 in England, he came to know Mary Bosanquet Fletcher, (Note: Following John Kingston's Wesleyan trial in 1807, Mary referred to him as "a bad man.") who was then the widow of John William Fletcher, and also Fletcher's family at Madeley, Shropshire. He would often be in Fletcher's study, or be looking through many of the books in his library. In 1814, John Kingston published a biography of John William Fletcher. This biography was 231 pages long and contained recollections from Fletcher's widow and large extracts from accounts of Fletcher's life as given by John Wesley, Joseph Benson, Joshua Gilpin, and Henry Venn (Clapham Sect). This biography was followed in the same book by an edition of one of Fletcher's books.

In 1818, John Kingston sailed to England, and with his children stayed with his older sister Sarah, in London. Sarah was then the wife of John Spooner. (Note: Sarah Kingston was married to John Spooner at Towcester, on 7 February 1785. She died at Rawstorne Street, Clerkenwell, London, on 9 January 1824. Her Obituary from the Northampton Mercury, gave her address at the time of death as "Rawstone Street." This Obituary also states that she was the wife of John Spooner, and was formerly of Towcester: "On 9 January, in Rawstone Street, London, Mrs. Sarah Spooner, aged 61 years, wife of Mr. Jno. Spooner, formerly of Towcester in this county." Sarah was buried at St James, Clerkenwell, on 14 January 1824. On the burial register is stated her street address of "Rawstorne Street." This was actually the correct name for this street.) John Kingston's wife, Jane, visited the children twice while they were at John's sister's house. She found them "ill-nourished and in need of clothing." While in London, John Kingston met with a Mr. Hardisty, a Cheesemonger, who he had known from America, lent him money, and set up his son Thomas Branwell Kingston to learn the business as a Cheesemonger. But Mr. Hardisty did not like the work, and could not afford to pay Kingston back the money. Mr. Hardisty gave up the shop, and signed the stock over to Kingston. But John Kingston was forced into paying an assistant to carry the shop on because he knew nothing about being a Cheesemonger. The business still failed as the stock dried up under the summer heat. After ten months in England, John Kingston sailed back to the United States. His wife Jane wanted him to leave the children with her in Penzance. But John Kingston did not want to. His daughter, Maria Ann, died in Baltimore soon after returning from England.

== Death ==
John Kingston had moved to New York by early 1824, and set up business as a bookseller at 130, Broadway. John died at this address on 24 April 1824. He died of pleurisy and was buried two days later at the Methodist Cemetery on Allen Street.
