= Brontëan =

Brontëan (or, less frequently, Brontean) means "pertaining to or characteristic of the works of..."

- The Brontë family, a literary family, or any of its members:
  - Anne Brontë, novelist and poet
  - Branwell Brontë, painter and poet
  - Charlotte Brontë, novelist and poet
  - Emily Brontë, novelist and poet
  - Patrick Brontë, curate and writer
