= The Rural Minstrel =

The Rural Minstrel: A Miscellany of Descriptive Poems is an 1813 book of poetry by Patrick Brontë. It was Brontë's second book of poetry after his Cottage Poems of 1811.

The title page describes the book as "Printed and sold by P.K. Holden, for the author, 1813" and that the book was sold by B. and R. Crosby & Co. of Stationer's Court, London. The collection has 108 pages and was priced at 5 shillings.

The collection includes a long poem set at Kirkstall Abbey, where Brontë had proposed to Maria Branwell in 1812. The poem "Lines, Addressed to a Lady on her Birth-day" is dedicated to Maria on her 30th birthday. The Rural Minstrel was published nine months after Patrick and Maria's wedding in December 1812.

== Reception ==
Charles Frederick Forshaw in his book The Poets of Keighley, Bingley, Haworth and District described The Rural Minstrel as a "distinct improvement upon his former work" and that "Irish reminiscences again form the staple of the subjects".

The collection received a negative review in the Monthly Review which wrote that "If [critics] are angry it is because some author, presuming on talents which he does not possess has given them a head-ache" and critiqued Brontë's description of God's anger toward the world which was redeemed by Jesus Christ and that "Such representations can do no credit towards the Christian faith or the Christian muse".

== List of poems ==
- "The Sabbath Bell"
- "Kirkstall Abbey"
- "Extemporary Verses, written at a Reverend Friend's House, during his Absence"
- "Lines, Addressed to a Lady on her Birth-day"
- "An Elegy"
- "Reflections by Moonlight"
- "Winter"
- "Rural Happiness"
- "The Distress and Relief"
- "The Christian's Farewell"
- "The Harper of Erith"
