= Joseph Loxdale Frost =

English parish priest

Joseph Loxdale Frost (1809/1810–1868) was an English parish priest, for many years at Bowling, Bradford. He is known for his support of Richard Oastler and the factory reform movement.

== Background and education ==
He was born in Liverpool, the son of Lawrence Frost, a timber merchant there, and his wife Mary Atcherley, daughter of James Atcherley, headmaster of Shrewsbury Grammar School from 1770 to 1798. He matriculated at Christ's College, Cambridge in 1831, aged 21, moving to Magdalene College in 1833, and graduating B.A. 1838, M.A. 1841.

Lawrence Frost of Macclesfield and John and Michael Ashton of Liverpool, timber merchants trading as Frost & Ashtons, suffered bankruptcy in 1816. A cargo of their timber on the Agincourt was at issue in a court case of 1818. Creditors were still receiving payment in 1833. Michael Ashton, a Wesleyan Methodist, was able to retire from business and join family in Australia, where he died in 1872.

Hannah Frost, Lawrence's sister (died 1847, aged 55), was married to Samuel Thorp of Macclesfield, and was a member of the Society of Friends. Samuel Thorp (died 1860), son of the Quaker John Thorp of Wilmslow, was in business as a silk manufacturer, and was the first mayor of Macclesfield under the Municipal Corporations Act 1835.

== Priest at Bowling ==
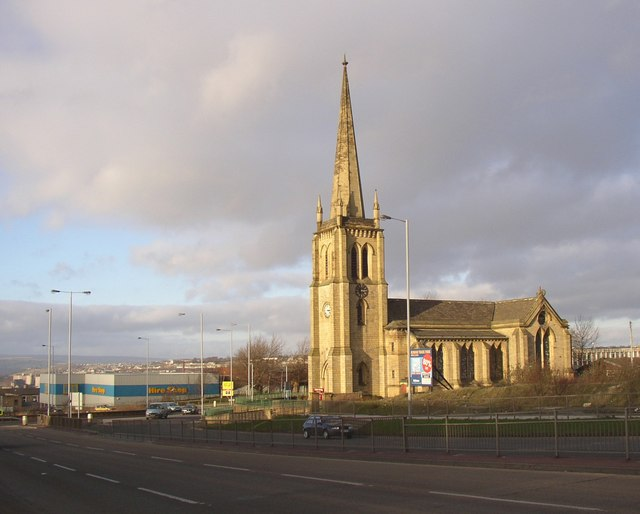
St John's Church, Wakefield Road, Bowling, Bradford, 2008 photograph

Frost was ordained deacon by Charles Longley, the Bishop of Ripon in 1838, and priest in 1839. He was a curate at Bingley in 1841, where the vicar from 1837 was James Cheadle, appointed by Longley, and also headmaster of Bingley Grammar School. Bingley was a noted evangelical parish at this period.

St John's Church, Bowling, was built in 1840–1 to a design by Richard Hey Sharp and his brother Samuel, able to seat 900, with 443 free places. The work was financed by the Bowling Iron Works, which also gave the land for the church. Frost was appointed the first parish priest there, a perpetual curate, in 1842. With Low Moor to the south-west, which had another ironworks, Bowling was a major area for Bradford's heavy industry at the beginning of the Victorian period.

In 1849 Frost was incorporated ad eundem at the University of Oxford.

== Activist ==
Samuel McGowan Kydd, a barrister and Tory radical Chartist who acted as secretary to Richard Oastler, mentioned Frost in his History of the Factory Movement (1857) as a clerical leader in the movement on the national stage. Oastler in the early 1840s was an associate of Michael Thomas Sadler in a campaign by then running for a decade to improve conditions for industrial work, but in the Fleet Prison for debt. Frost spoke at an 1843 meeting in Bradford for his release, part of the "Oastley Liberty" campaign launched by John Fielden, where William Busfeild Ferrand MP led. Ferrand (formerly Busfeild) belonged to the Elland Clerical Society, founded by Henry Venn. The Rev. William Morgan also spoke at the meeting.

The movement, often also called the Ten Hours Movement, arose after the limited reform in the Labour in Cotton Mills Act 1831 gained by John Cam Hobhouse, and pressed for statutory reduction of working hours. It was largely centred in Yorkshire, operated through "short-hours committees", and came to be led in the 1830s by Oastler. The Factories Act 1847 or "Ten Hours Act" was the apparent culmination of the campaign. But the split shift expedient of employers, over which magistrates were reluctant to convict, brought Lord Ashley to the Factories Act 1850, which included a trade-off. While the act was still a bill, Frost petitioned Parliament on the matter, through Henry Goulburn. The opening of the petition read:

"[...] your petitioner, having lived amongst a large population (chiefly factory workers) for the last twelve years, has rejoiced to see the beneficial effects of the reduction of working hours in the factories, upon the physical, moral and religious conditions of the operatives and their families. That the system of relays and shifts, now declared to be "not illegal", would utterly defeat the humane intentions of the legislature in passing the Ten Hours Act.[...]

Frost was also a critic of the operation of the New Poor Law. At an 1853 meeting in Manchester of poor-law board guardians and others, he proposed the following motion, which was passed:

"That this meeting is of the opinion that the powers possessed by the Poor-law Board of making orders which have the force of law are most unconstitutional in principle and mischievous in practice, and which Parliament has no right to delegate; and, therefore, this meeting determines to make every effort in the next session to prevent the renewal of such powers."
