= Joseph Bentley Leyland =

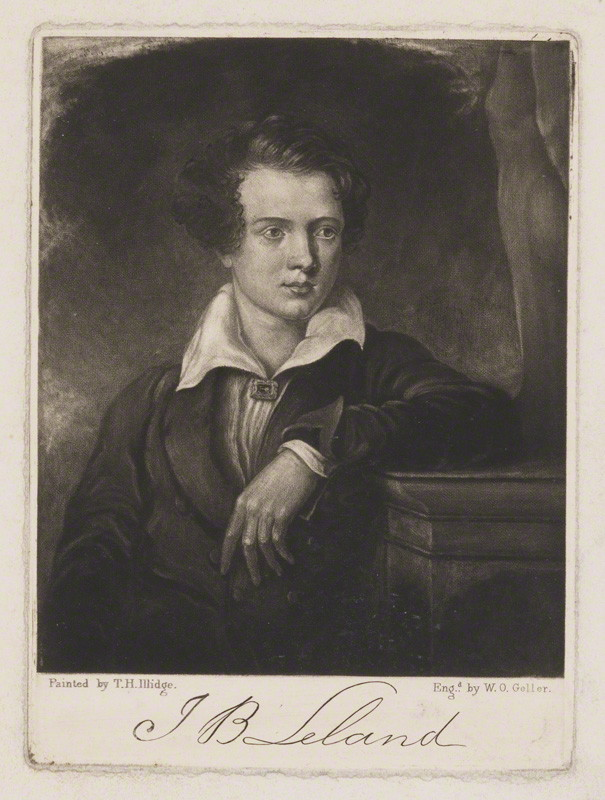
Joseph Bentley Leyland by William Overend Geller, after Thomas Henry Illidge.

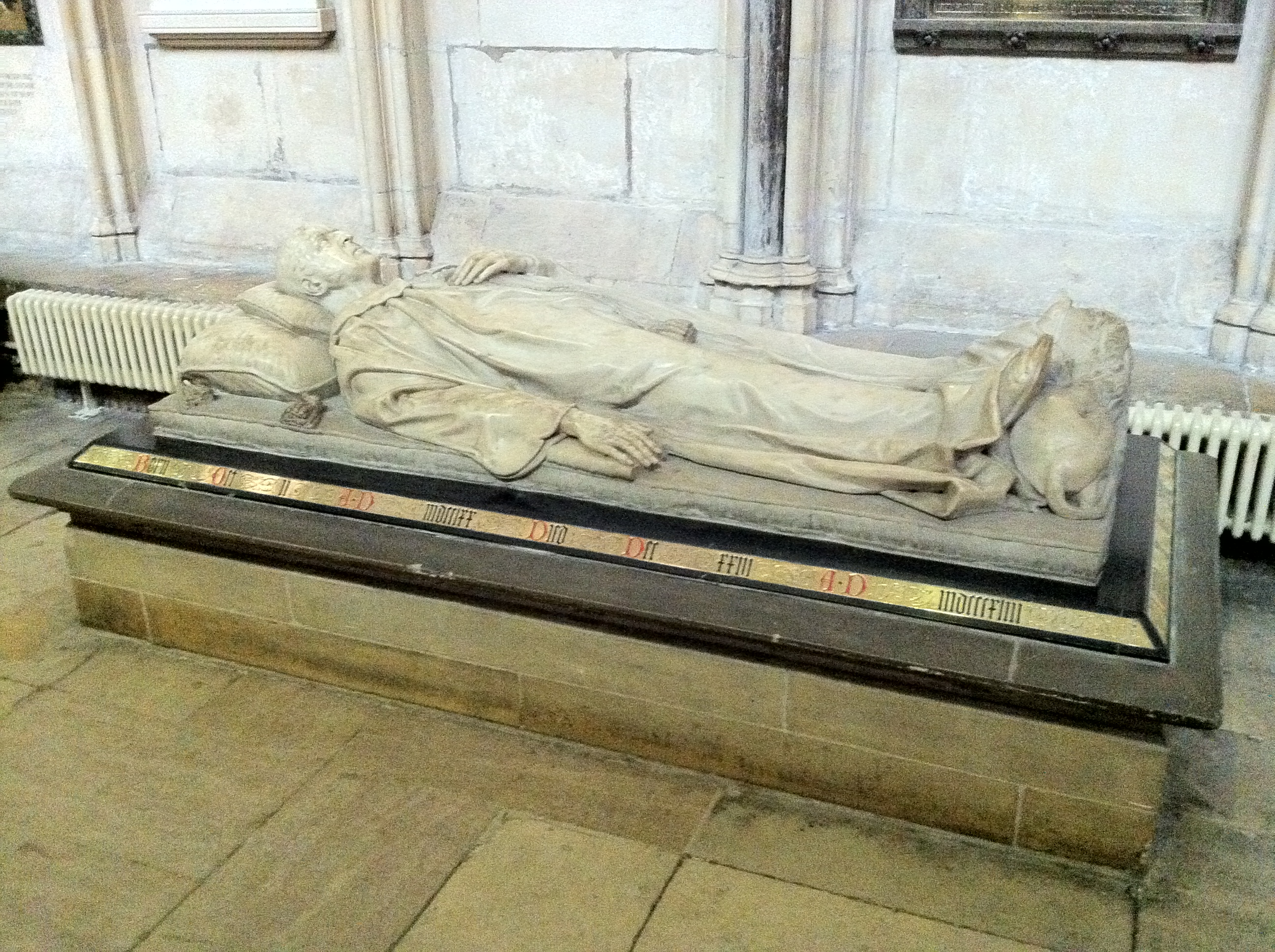
Leyland's effigy of Stephen Beckwith, in York Minster

Joseph Bentley Leyland (1811–1851) was a sculptor from Halifax, England. His brother was Francis A Leyland, the Halifax antiquarian and publisher, who designed the seal for Halifax Corporation and the coat of arms of Halifax.

Joseph was a good friend of Branwell Brontë. Like him, his talent was largely unfulfilled. He was often in debt and died an alcoholic three years after Branwell. Leyland introduced Bronte to an active artistic social group in Halifax. This included William Dearden, George Hogarth, John Nicholson, and John Wilson Anderson.

== Well-known works ==
- Memorial to Stephen Beckwith in York Minster
- African blood-hounds: a large group which Edwin Landseer described as "the noblest modern work of its kind", which was presented to Salford Museum after the sculptor's death and subsequently destroyed.
