= William Morgan (1782–1858) =

Welsh cleric (1782–1858)

William Morgan (1782–1858) was a Welsh evangelical cleric, known for his support of factory reform. He was also a close friend of the Brontë family.

== Life ==
Morgan was from Brecknockshire, and wrote of himself that he was "born and educated" in the Church of England. He was ordained priest on 22 September 1805, at the time a curate at St Cynog's, Boughrood, in Radnorshire, appointed and ordained deacon in 1804, both ordinations by Thomas Burgess. The vicar there, and incumbent in the other parishes of Llangynog and Llanganten, was Benjamin Howell.

Still a curate. Morgan met Patrick Brontë in Wellington, Shropshire in 1809. At this period, Morgan was introduced to Mary Fletcher at Madeley, Shropshire, by John Eyton, the vicar of Wellington to whom Brontë was curate. Through Mary Fletcher, Morgan met both John Crosse, whose curate at Bradford he became, and the Fennell family into which he married. John Fennell moved north in 1811 to Rawdon, West Yorkshire, a founding master of Woodhouse Grove School.

Morgan gained a Yorkshire living at Bierley in 1812. He was admitted as a sizar at Emmanuel College, Cambridge in 1813. He was awarded the B.D. degree as a ten-year man in 1823, from Queens' College, Cambridge. He appointed curate at St Peter's, Bradford in 1815 to Crosse, who died the following year. He was then perpetual curate of Christ Church, Bradford from 1815 to 1851, taking up the post as the first incumbent in what was a new church. It was to a design by Thomas Taylor and was built on a plot of land given in 1813, by a member of the local Rawson family. Some of the finance was anonymous, from a female donor, via George Gaskin as intermediary. The church plan was large, seating 1300, and was noted for the 400 seats free of pew rents originally provided (later rising). The church was pulled down in 1878.

The building costs for Christ Church were not completely met by the funds, imposing an ongoing burden. Morgan in 1817 wrote an article for the Anti-Jacobin Review, containing an unsubtle hint of his need for money. For a time he also kept a school in Darby Street, Bradford.

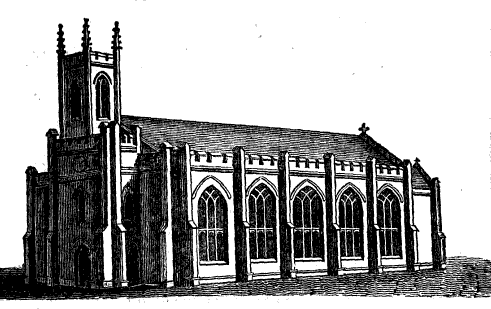
Christ Church, Bradford, 1830 engraving

In later life Morgan was vicar of Hulcott, Buckinghamshire, from 1851 to 1858. He died that year, at 10 South Parade, Bath.

== Views ==
Morgan was an enthusiastic supporter of the Welsh language, which he called "the strong, nervous and sublime Language of Wales". This was written in an inscription of 1821 to his copy of Y Beibl, the Bible in Welsh as translated by his namesake William Morgan (1545–1604). He donated the book to the library of Bradford Grammar School.

In his Christian Instructions, Morgan recommended nonconformist theological literature, and the works of Thomas Erskine of Linlathen. He saw value in both Calvin and Arminius. Charlotte Brontë, who regarded Morgan as a "stuffy and bombastic pedant", received from him a gift of the Book of Common Prayer in 1831.

Morgan was strongly opposed to Catholic Emancipation. In late 1825, when Henry Heap as vicar of Bradford ordered his clergy to have their congregations sign petitions, requesting that Richard Fountayne Wilson should stand for parliament, Morgan did more than most. Fountayne Wilson had that year shown his opposition to "Catholic relief" from penal laws, as well as supporting the Corn Laws. Most of the Bradford clerics made the petition available to sign in the vestry: Morgan was in the smaller group who read from Heap's requisition during the service. The issue was one on which Morgan and Patrick Brontë had differences.

Esther de Waal, in reviewing Owen Chadwick's The Victorian Church and related works, placed Morgan as one of the "Evangelical Tory clergyman" who showed the Church of England's support for the "movement for factory reform", described as almost universal in the major manufacturing towns of northern England (with Halifax as an exception). In the Bradford area she mentions also John Compton Boddington, and Joseph Loxdale Frost, of a later period; at Leeds Walter Hook, and in Wakefield, John Sharp of Horbury. Successors were found in the generation under Tractarian influence. At the time when the Ten Hours Act 1847 was about to become law, and John Bright was pressing the idea that a reduction in hours of work entailed reduction of wages, Morgan chaired a meeting at Christ Church on the point, with factory workers. A local newspaper report carried a report stating feeling that the theory "ought to be blown to the winds".

== Works ==
Morgan edited, in 1815–6, The Pastoral Visitor. It was a monthly periodical consisting of tracts, in association with his parochial visiting in Bradford. Some of his other works were:

- Christian Instructions (1824, 2 vols.)
- The Parish Priest: Pourtrayed in the Life, Character, and Ministry, of the Rev. John Crosse, Late Vicar of Bradford, Yorkshire, and Chaplain to the Right Honourable the Earl De la Ware (1841)

== Family ==
Morgan married three times. His first wife, whom he married in 1812, was Jane Branwell Fennell (1791–1827), daughter of John Fennell, a Methodist schoolteacher. John Fennell was ordained in the Church of England, and became a curate at Keighley and then St Peter's Bradford, in 1815. Jane Fennell was a cousin of Maria Branwell, mother of the Brontë sisters. Maria visited the Fennells after their move to Yorkshire, and so met her future husband Patrick. It was a double wedding: William officiated to marry Patrick and Maria, Patrick officiated to marry William and Jane.

Morgan's second wife, whom he married in 1836, was Mary Alice Gibson of Bradford. She died in 1852, and he married again, at the end of his life.
