= Elizabeth Branwell =

Aunt of the Brontë sisters (1776–1842)

Elizabeth Branwell (1776 – 25 October 1842) was the aunt of the literary sisters Charlotte Brontë, Emily Brontë and Anne Brontë.

Called 'Aunt Branwell', she helped raise the Brontë children after her sister, Maria Brontë, died in 1821. She managed the household until her own death in 1842.

== Early life ==
Elizabeth Branwell was one of twelve children born to the Cornish couple Thomas Branwell and Anne Carne in Penzance, Cornwall. The family was very successful in the import and export trade while her father owned a brewery, an inn and the largest grocers' emporium in the town. The close-knit family was broken up by the death of Thomas Branwell in 1808 and of his wife the next year. Maria Branwell moved north to Yorkshire where she met her husband, Patrick Brontë, while Elizabeth most likely moved in with her married sister, Charlotte. It was for this sister that Maria's daughter, Charlotte Brontë, was named. Not much is known of Elizabeth's remaining time in Penzance, but she was a member of polite society and she had a private income of £50 which would have allowed her to live comfortably.

== 'Aunt Branwell' ==
Elizabeth Branwell visited Maria in 1815 in Hartshead, Yorkshire where Patrick was curate. She would have then met her nieces Maria and Elizabeth, the latter of which was her namesake. Elizabeth helped her sister's family move to Thornton, Yorkshire where Patrick was offered a larger living. She stayed on with the family for a year and helped with Maria's confinement with Charlotte, born in 1816. Elizabeth Branwell returned to Penzance soon after the family settled in at Thornton. In the summer of 1821 she would be called back to Maria's side, this time in Haworth, Yorkshire, where her sister was suffering from ovarian cancer. Maria died on 15 September 1821, after a long agony. Elizabeth decided to stay on temporarily to help take care of Maria and Patrick's six children.

== Aunt, mother, friend ==
When Elizabeth Branwell took over the care of her nieces and nephew, the oldest, Maria, was seven years old while the youngest, Anne, was only twenty months. Elizabeth, at 45, was considered a spinster and though she missed the warmth and familiarity of her Cornish homeland, she stayed in the cold and secluded Haworth to help Patrick raise and educate his children. She kept the family on a strict routine and was mostly concerned with running the house and caring for the little ones. When the two eldest girls, Maria and Elizabeth, died from tuberculosis contracted at the Cowan Bridge School, Patrick decided to keep the children at home where he and Elizabeth would oversee their education. Branwell Brontë, the only boy of the family, especially doted upon "Aunt Branwell" as he craved a mother figure in the wake of the death of his own.

== Influence on Brontës ==
Elizabeth Branwell subscribed to several magazines that the children enjoyed reading as youths. Charlotte remembers "reading them by stealth and with the most exquisite pleasure." Elizabeth also continued to receive her annual income and needed very little money to live upon. As a result, she was able to fund many of the Brontë's adventures that would otherwise have proved impossible. She gave the girls money to open a boarding school, though the project failed to attract any pupils. She also paid for Charlotte and Emily's trip to Brussels to study French.

== Death ==
Elizabeth Branwell unexpectedly fell ill in October 1842 with a bowel obstruction. Charlotte and Emily were in Brussels at the time and were notified of their aunt's illness. It was too late, however, as Elizabeth died four days later on 25 October 1842 in Haworth, Yorkshire. Branwell, rumoured to have been Elizabeth's favourite, was devastated. He wrote to a friend "I have now lost the guide and director of all the happy days connected with my childhood." She was buried in the family vault near the remains of her sister and two nieces.
