= Maria Branwell =

Mother of the Brontë sisters (1783–1821)

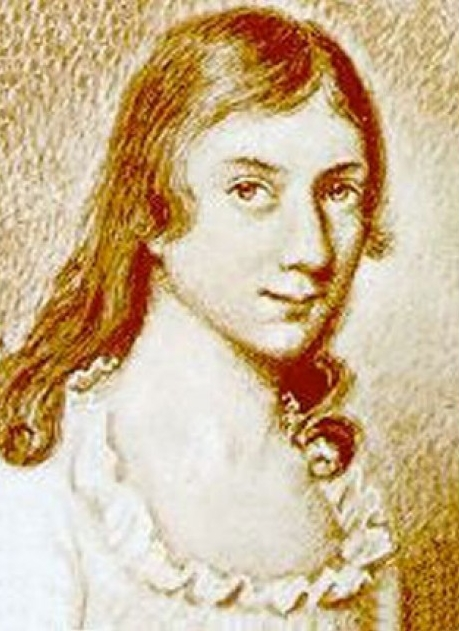
- Born: Maria Branwell; 15 April 1783
- Died: 15 September 1821 (aged 38)
- Spouse: Patrick Brontë (m. 1812)
- Children: Maria Brontë; Elizabeth Brontë; Charlotte Brontë; Branwell Brontë; Emily Brontë; Anne Brontë
- Relatives: Elizabeth Branwell (sister)

Maria Brontë (née Branwell; 15 April 1783 – 15 September 1821) was the mother of the writers Emily Brontë, Anne Brontë, Charlotte Brontë and of their brother Branwell Brontë.

Born in Penzance, Maria Branwell was the daughter of a successful Methodist merchant and civic leader. After the deaths of her parents, at age 29, Maria moved to Yorkshire to help her aunt with the domestic needs of Woodhouse Grove School. There she met Patrick Brontë, who also worked for the school; they married after a brief courtship. Much of Maria's married life was spent in Thornton, where she gave birth to her six children: Maria, Elizabeth, Charlotte, Patrick (known as Branwell), Emily, and Anne. Shortly after Anne's birth, the family moved to Haworth, where Maria fell critically ill and died eight months later, aged 38. Maria's sister Elizabeth Branwell became ward for the children.

== Early life ==
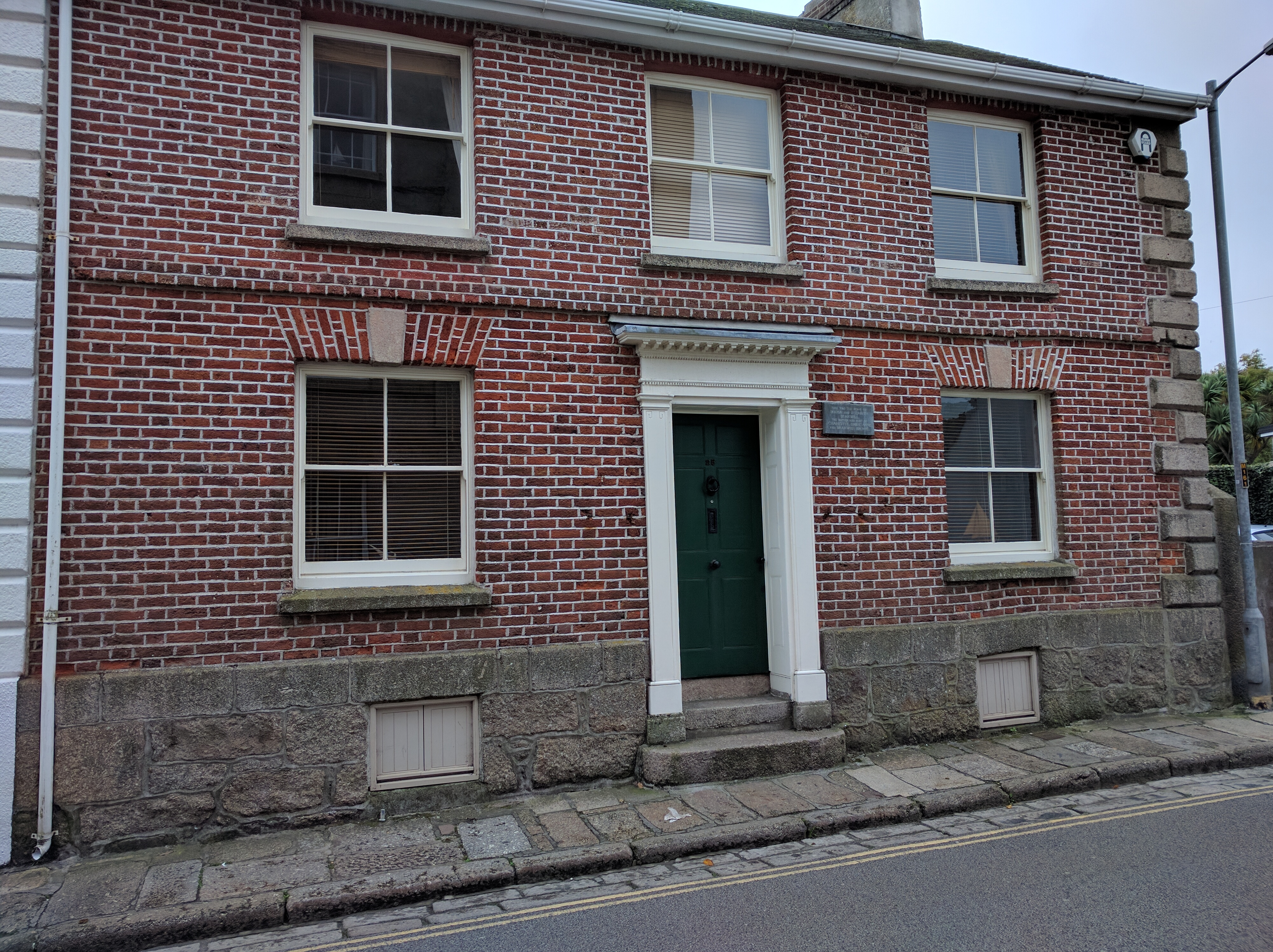
Maria Branwell's House, Penzance

Maria Branwell was born on 15 April 1783 to Anne Carne (1743–1809) and Thomas Branwell (1746–1808) in Penzance, Cornwall. Thomas Branwell was a successful merchant in groceries and luxuries, owning properties and farmland nearby. Anne Carne was the daughter of a Penzance silversmith and watchmaker. Maria was the eleventh of twelve children: six had died by the time of her birth; seven survived to adulthood.

Thomas Branwell held public office as one of 12 "Assistants to the Corporation" (of the city). Maria's brother Benjamin also became a member of the corporation and was elected mayor in 1809. The family were prominent Methodists. Several women in the family married clergymen of Wesleyan leanings: Maria's aunt (Thomas's sister) Jane married John Fennell in 1790; Maria's sister Jane Branwell married John Kingston in 1800.

== Courtship and marriage ==
In 1812, soon after the death of her parents, Maria moved to Yorkshire to help her aunt Jane with the household management of Woodhouse Grove, a new school in Rawdon for the sons of Methodist ministers. Her uncle John Fennell, a former schoolmaster and Methodist class leader in Penzance and Wellington, Shropshire, had been appointed headmaster of the school in 1812. There, Maria met Patrick Brontë, an Irish curate who had known John Fennell in Shropshire's Wesleyan circles, and who was currently serving as an examiner at Woodhouse Grove. Maria was 29, and Patrick was six years older, but the couple 'loved at first sight.' During their courtship Patrick regularly walked the 24-mile round trip from Hartshead to see her, and Maria wrote numerous letters to him. In one of them, she mentions the prospect of leaving her beloved home, writing in October 1812:

Unless my love for you were very great how could I so contentedly give up my home and all my friends – a home I loved for so long that I have often thought nothing could bribe me to renounce it for any great length of time… Yet the anticipation of sharing with you all the pleasures and pains, the cares and anxieties of life… is more delightful to me than any other prospect which this world can possibly present.

The couple were married on 29 December 1812 at Guiseley Parish Church by Reverend William Morgan, a mutual friend who, on the same day, married Jane and John Fennell's daughter, Jane Branwell Fennell.

Maria was described by Elizabeth Gaskell as follows:

Miss Branwell was extremely small in person; not pretty, but very elegant, and always dressed with a quiet simplicity of taste, which accorded well with her general character…

She loved reading, and her tastes encompassed religious works, but also gothic fiction and poetry. She had a subscription to the Lady's Magazine, copies of which she brought with her when she moved to Haworth. After her death, Charlotte read the magazines, but they were eventually confiscated by Patrick because they contained "foolish love stories."

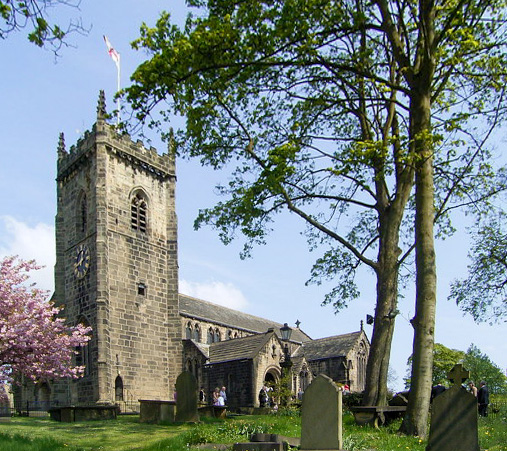
Branwell married Patrick Brontë at St Oswald's Church, Guiseley

== Later life ==
Maria and Patrick's first home was Clough House in Hightown. Their first two children, Maria and Elizabeth, were born there in 1813 or 1814 and in 1815. Their second home was in Thornton, where their remaining children were born: Charlotte in 1816; Patrick Branwell in 1817; Emily Jane in 1818 and Anne in 1820. Soon after the birth of Anne, the family moved to the mill town of Haworth, where Patrick had been offered the position of perpetual curate of St. Michael and all Angels Church. Patrick encountered problems on moving in; some of his parishioners resented his appointment, and there were angry scenes and attempts to disrupt his sermons. Shortly after this, Maria fell ill with what was thought to be uterine cancer. She died on 15 September 1821, following seven months of progressively serious symptoms. "Death pursued her unrelentingly," wrote Patrick, saying that she suffered "more agonizing pain than I ever saw anyone endure." Maria died, surrounded by her young family, exclaiming: "Oh, my poor children!" Maria's sister Elizabeth, who had moved in to help with the children during Maria's illness, remained to care for them on a permanent basis. Maria was buried on 22 September 1821 at Haworth. William Morgan performed the burial ceremony.

In 1850, Maria’s daughter Charlotte was given the letters written by Maria to Patrick. On reading them, Charlotte wrote:

“It was strange now to peruse, for the first time, the records of a mind whence my own sprang… and at once sad and sweet to find that mind of a truly fine, pure and elevated order… There is a refinement, a modesty, a gentleness about them indescribable (...) I wish that she had lived, and that I had known her”.

== Works ==
Besides her letters Maria wrote an essay entitled: "The Advantages of Poverty, In Religious Concerns." The essay can be found in the book Life and Letters by Clement Shorter. The essay can also be found with surviving letters in the appendix of Wright 2021. In it, she writes:

What is poverty? Nothing - or rather a something which, with the assistance, and blessing of our Gracious Master, will greatly promote our spiritual welfare, & tend to increase, & strengthen our efforts to gain that Land of pure delight.

== See also ==
- Brontë family
