= Branwell Brontë =

British artist (1817–1848)

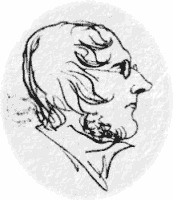
- Branwell Brontë, self-portrait, 1840
- Born: Patrick Branwell Brontë; 26 June 1817; Thornton, West Riding of Yorkshire, England
- Died: 24 September 1848 (aged 31); Haworth, West Riding of Yorkshire, England
- Occupation: Painter
- Parent(s): Patrick Brontë; Maria Branwell
- Relatives: Brontë family

Patrick Branwell Brontë (/ˈbrɒnti/, commonly /-teɪ/; 26 June 1817 – 24 September 1848) was an English poet and artist. He was the only son of the Brontë literary family, and brother of the writers Charlotte, Emily, and Anne.

His parents were Patrick Brontë, an Anglican minister, and Maria Branwell Brontë, the daughter of a merchant from Penzance. Known as Branwell, he was born in Thornton, near Bradford, in the West Riding of Yorkshire. In 1820 Branwell and his family moved to Haworth, where his father had been appointed perpetual curate. In 1821, Maria Branwell fell critically ill and died, and Maria's sister Elizabeth Branwell moved in with the family to care for the six young children.

Although Branwell's sisters were sent away to school, Branwell was educated at home, both by his father and later by a series of tutors. He was given a classical education, and earned praise for his poetry and translations from the classics. He showed a keen interest in literature, and along with his sisters, Charlotte, Emily and Anne, took an active role in the creation of the fantasy worlds of Angria and the Glass Town Confederacy, helping create little books, plays and articles based on their fictional heroes.

As an adult, Branwell attempted a career in poetry, then worked as a portrait painter, then as a private tutor with two local families. However, he succumbed to drug and alcohol addiction, apparently worsened by a failed relationship with a married woman. He died of tuberculosis at the age of 31.

== Childhood ==
Branwell Brontë was born on June 26, 1817, in Thornton, near Bradford, in the West Riding of Yorkshire. He was the fourth of six children and the only son of Patrick Brontë (1777–1861), an Anglican minister originally from a large, impoverished Irish family, and Maria Branwell Brontë (1783–1821), the daughter of a prosperous Methodist merchant from Penzance. Branwell and his siblings were all born in a house (now known as the Brontë Birthplace) on Market Street, in Thornton. In 1820, when Branwell was three, the family moved to Haworth, where Patrick had been appointed to the perpetual curacy.

=== Haworth ===
Haworth was on the edge of the moors, and was considered one of the worst places in the country to live because of its poor sanitation. The Parsonage overlooked the cemetery, which at the time was so overcrowded that the village's water supply had been contaminated by seepage. In 1850, Benjamin Babbage's health report outlined serious problems, such as open sewers, offal from the slaughterhouse standing for months in the streets, poor waste disposal and damp and unhygienic living conditions. It is widely believed that these conditions contributed to the health problems encountered by the Brontë siblings.

As an Irish immigrant, Patrick faced prejudice in Haworth. The Irish were perceived at the time to be feckless, drunk and poor, and Patrick, with his large family and modest income, was the target of gossip and speculation. His children initially shared his Irish accent, as well as the feeling of "foreignness" that he retained till the end of his life, and they did not mix with local children, keeping very much to themselves.

=== Death of Maria Brontë ===
In 1821, Maria Branwell Brontë fell ill, and in September she died after a long illness, believed to have been uterine cancer. Maria's sister Elizabeth Branwell had moved in with the family to help care for the children, the eldest of whom was seven years old, the youngest not yet two. After Maria's death, Elizabeth Branwell stayed on to help, and eventually agreed to live at the Parsonage permanently. The children were subsequently cared for by their aunt, and by the house servant, Tabby Ackroyd.

=== Education ===
Although four of his five sisters were sent to Cowan Bridge boarding school, Branwell was educated at home. Patrick Brontë provided his son with a classical education, tutoring the boy himself in Latin, Greek and mathematics. Elizabeth Gaskell, in her biography of Charlotte Brontë, says of Branwell's schooling:

Mr. Brontë's friends advised him to send his son to school; but, remembering both the strength of will of his own youth and his mode of employing it, he believed that Branwell was better at home, and that he himself could teach him well, as he had told others before.

In 1825, just before Branwell's eighth birthday, his two eldest sisters, Maria and Elizabeth, were sent home ill from Cowan Bridge School following an outbreak of typhus. Both girls died shortly afterwards of tuberculosis, possibly exacerbated by the poor conditions at the school. Their loss affected the whole family deeply, and Charlotte and Emily were sent home to continue their education at the Parsonage. Patrick, himself a poet, had an extensive library, which he made available to his children, and subscribed to several newspapers and publications. Even as a young boy Branwell read extensively, and was especially fond of the "Noctes Ambrosianae", literary dialogues published in Blackwood's Magazine. Other favourites included: Aesop's Fables, the Arabian Nights, Walter Scott's Tales of a Grandfather and Thomas Bewick's History of British Birds.

In 1829–30, Patrick Brontë engaged John Bradley, an artist from neighbouring Keighley, as drawing-master for the children. Bradley was an artist of some local repute, rather than a professional instructor, but he may have fostered Branwell's enthusiasm for art and architecture. Bradley emigrated to America in 1831, and Branwell continued his studies under the portrait painter William Robinson. In 1834, he painted a portrait of his three sisters which remains notable as the only existing portrait of Charlotte, Emily and Anne together. Branwell initially included his own image in the portrait, but later became dissatisfied with it and painted himself out, replacing his image with a pillar. This portrait is now one of the best known images of the sisters and hangs in the National Portrait Gallery, London.

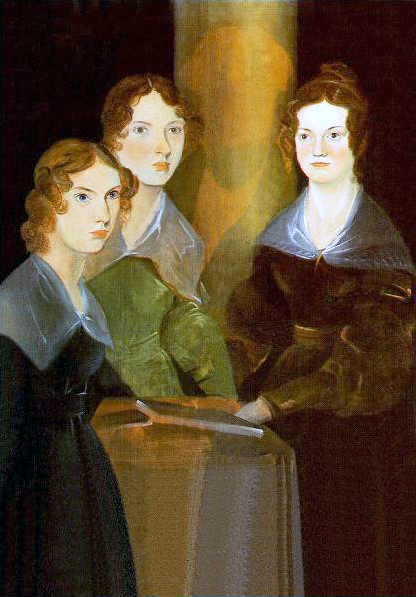
Portrait of Anne, Emily and Charlotte, by Branwell Brontë. (Branwell used to be between Emily and Charlotte, but subsequently painted himself out.)

== Juvenilia ==
From 1826, Branwell and his siblings began to create a series of increasingly complex fantasy role-playing games and plays featuring the "Young Men", or "the Twelves"; characters based on a set of wooden soldiers Branwell had received from his father. These plays evolved into an intricate saga set in a fictionalised version of West Africa called the Glass Town Confederacy.

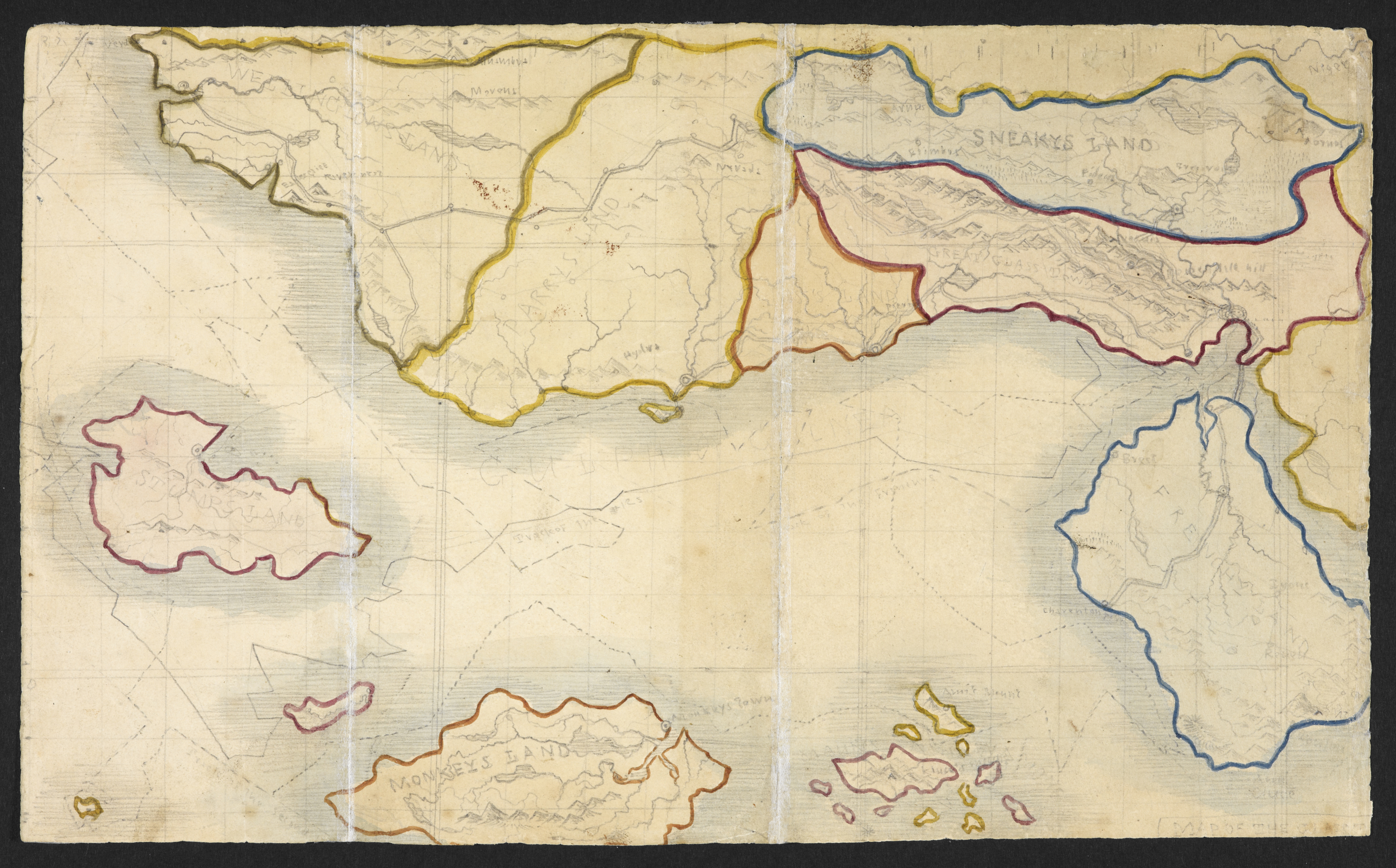
Map of the Glass Town Federation and surrounding lands in The History of the Young Men from their First Settlement to the Present Time by Branwell Brontë, c. 1830–31

Branwell both collaborated and competed with his sister Charlotte to expand this imaginary world, which they named Angria. Branwell's particular interest in these paracosms were their politics and wars, including the destructive rivalry between their heroes, Charlotte's Arthur Wellesley, Duke of Zamorna, and his own, Alexander Percy, Earl of Northangerland. These juvenile writings impress by their virtuosity and scope, but are also repetitive when compared to Charlotte's contributions. Branwell often wrote under several pseudonyms, such as Captain John Bud, Sergeant Bud, and Chief Genius Bany, who were also characters in their world. Christine Alexander, a Brontë juvenilia historian at the University of New South Wales, wrote:

Both Charlotte and Branwell ensured the consistency of their imaginary world. When Branwell exuberantly kills off important characters in his manuscripts, Charlotte comes to the rescue and, in effect, resurrects them for the next stories [...]; and when Branwell becomes bored with his inventions, such as the Glass Town magazine he edits, Charlotte takes over his initiative and keeps the publication going for several more years. It was Branwell, however, who took a pride in systematizing their private world and maintaining a consistent political structure, features typical of paracosmic play. He documented in encyclopedic detail, in neat lists, footnotes, sketches, and maps, the geography, history, government, and social structure of the Glass Town Federation (and later, the new kingdom of Angria)—laying down the parameters of the imaginary world.

Surrounded by his sisters and missing the company of other boys, Branwell's early works reflect his pleasure in the wider options he would have in later life and adulthood. In January 1829, aged 11, he began a magazine, later named Branwell's Blackwood's Magazine, which included his poems, plays, criticisms, histories, and dialogues. After six months, Branwell abandoned the project, and Charlotte took it over.

== Aspirations ==
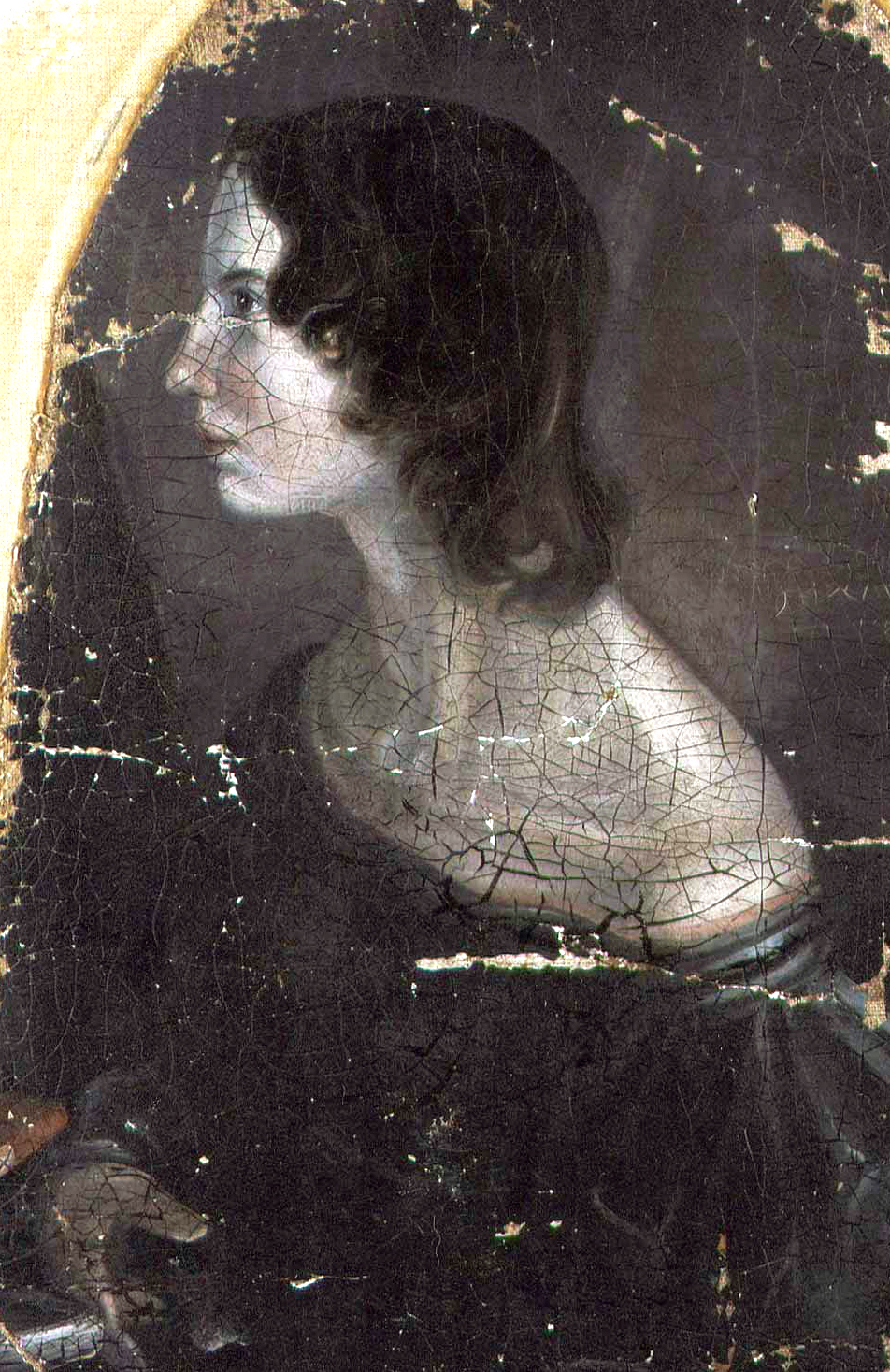
Portrait by Brontë about 1833; it is disputed whether the image is of Emily or Anne Brontë.

Unlike his sisters, who were expected to seek employment as governesses or teachers, Branwell was not prepared for a specific career, although he aspired from an early age to be either a poet or a painter. On the death of James Hogg, a Blackwood's writer, the 18-year-old Branwell boldly wrote to the magazine suggesting himself as a replacement:

I have perhaps spoken too openly respecting the extent of my powers, But I did so because I determined to say what I beleived [sic]; I know that I am not one of the wretched writers of the day … He [Hogg] and others like him gave your Magazine the peculiar character which made it famous. As these men die it will decay unless thier [sic] places be supplied by others like them. Now Sir, to you I appear writing with conceited assurance, but I am not – for I know myself so far as to beleive [sic] in my own originality; and on that ground I desire of you admittance into your ranks … Why, you have lost an able writer in James Hogg and God grant you may gain one in Patrick Branwell Brontë

Between 1835 and 1842, Branwell wrote a total of six times to the magazine, sending poems and offering his services. His letters were left unanswered. He began enjoying masculine company in the pubs in Haworth, and in February 1836 joined Haworth's Masonic Lodge of the Three Graces at the youngest possible age.

In 1835, Branwell wrote a letter to the Royal Academy of Arts seeking to be admitted. Earlier biographers report a move to London to study painting, which was quickly cut short following Branwell’s spending of his allowance on drink. Other biographers speculate that he was too intimidated to present himself at the Academy. More recent scholarship suggests that Branwell did not send the letter, or even make the trip to London. According to Francis Leyland, Branwell's friend and a future biographer of the family, his first job was as a junior master at a Halifax school. Branwell also worked as a portrait painter in Bradford in 1838 and 1839, where he met a clique of other artists who drank at the George Hotel, and he became a popular figure. Though some of his paintings show talent for comedic and serious styles, other portraits lack life, and he was unable to earn a living through his painting. Branwell returned to Haworth, in debt, in 1839.

== Adulthood ==
Returning to Haworth, Branwell began to envisage employment as a tutor. In January 1840, he took employment with the family of Robert Postlethwaite in Broughton-in-Furness. Unlike his sisters, who were live-in governesses, Branwell was not expected to live with the family, and was only committed to a couple of hours' tutoring a day.

During his time with the Postlethwaites, Branwell wrote letters to his pub friends in Haworth which paint "a vivid picture of Branwell's scabrous humour, his boastfulness, and his need to be accepted in a man's world". According to Branwell, he started his job off with a riotous drinking session in Kendal, although he was able to maintain a pretence of abstemiousness to his employers. He writes to his Masonic friend, John Brown:

If you saw me now, you would not know me, and you would laugh to hear the character people give me … What do they think I am? most calm, sedate, sober, abstemious, patient, mild-hearted, virtuous, gentlemanly philosopher, the picture of good works, and the treasure house of righteous thoughts. Cards are shuffled under the table-cloth, glasses are thrust into the cupboard if I enter the room. I take neither spirits, wine, nor malt liquors. Everybody says 'what a good young Gentleman is Mr. Postlethwaite’s tutor'…

During this period of employment he continued his literary work, including sending poems and translations to Thomas De Quincey and Hartley Coleridge, who both lived in the Lake District. At Coleridge's invitation, he visited the poet at his cottage; Coleridge encouraged him to pursue his translations of Horace's Odes. In June 1840 he sent the translations to Coleridge, after having been dismissed by the Postlethwaites after only six months. There is evidence that Branwell may have fathered an illegitimate child during his time in the town, but some scholars suspect this story to have been a boast by Branwell. Coleridge began an encouraging letter about the quality of the translations in November 1840, but never finished it.

=== Halifax ===
In October 1840, Branwell moved near to Halifax, where he entered artistic and literary circles. He made many friends, including the sculptor Joseph Bentley Leyland. Some of his poems were published in the Halifax Guardian under the name of his Angrian hero, Northangerland, making him the first of the Brontë siblings to be published.

Francis Leyland described Branwell as:

...rather below middle height, but of a refined and gentleman-like appearance, and of graceful manners. His complexion was fair and his features handsome; his mouth and chin were well-shaped; his nose was prominent and of the Roman type; his eyes sparkled and danced with delight, and his forehead made up of a face of oval form which gave an irresistible charm to its possessor, and attracted the admiration of those who knew him.

Another friend described him less flatteringly as: "almost insignificantly small" and with "a mass of red hair which he wore brushed off his forehead – to help his height I fancy – small ferrety eyes, deep sunk and still further hidden by the never removed spectacles."

During this time, Branwell obtained employment with the Manchester and Leeds Railway, initially as an assistant clerk in charge at Sowerby Bridge railway station, where he was paid £75 a year (paid quarterly). Later, on 1 April 1841, he was promoted to the post of clerk in charge at Luddendenfoot railway station in West Yorkshire, where his salary increased to £130.

Francis Grundy, a co-worker and engineer on the railway, later wrote of Branwell:

Had a position been chosen for this strange creature for the express purpose of driving him several steps to the bad, this must have been it. Alone in the wilds of Yorkshire, with few books, little to do, no prospects, and wretched pay, with no society congenial to his better tastes, but plenty of wild, rollicking, hard-headed, half-educated manufacturers, who would welcome him to their houses, and drink with him as often as he chose to come, what was this morbid man, who could not bear to be alone, to do?

In 1842, Branwell was dismissed due to a deficit in the accounts of £11–1s–7d. This was attributed to incompetence, rather than theft, and the missing sum was deducted from his salary. Once more, he was obliged to return to Haworth.

=== Thorp Green ===
In January 1843, after nine months at Haworth, Branwell took up another tutoring position. This was in Thorp Green, Little Ouseburn, near York, where he was to tutor the Reverend Edmund Robinson's son, and where Anne already served as governess to the children. At first, things went well, with Charlotte reporting in January 1843 that her siblings were "both wonderously valued in their situations."

However, during his 30 months at Thorp Green, Branwell developed an increasing infatuation with Robinson's wife Lydia, née Gisborne, a charming and sophisticated woman almost fifteen years his senior. He wrote to one of his friends that "my mistress is DAMNABLY TOO FOND OF ME," and had sent him a "lock of her hair, wch has lain at night on (his) breast – wd to God it could do so legally !" In July 1845, he was dismissed from his position.

Charlotte says in a letter to her friend Ellen Nussey:

I found Branwell ill – he is so very often owing to his own fault – I was not therefore shocked at first – but when Anne informed me of the immediate cause of his present illness I was greatly shocked, he had last Thursday received a note from Mr. Robinson sternly dismissing him, intimating that he had discovered his proceedings as bad beyond expression and charging him on pain of exposure to break off instantly and for ever all communication with every member of his family.

Multiple explanations have been given for this, but the most likely explanation is Branwell's own account that he had an affair with Mrs Robinson which he hoped would lead to marriage after her husband's death. For several months after his dismissal, he regularly received small amounts of money from Thorp Green, sent by Mrs. Robinson herself.

Once more Branwell returned home to his family at the Haworth parsonage, where he looked for employment, without success, wrote poetry and attempted to adapt Angrian material into a book called And the Weary are at Rest. Several of his poems were published in local newspapers under the name of Northangerland.

A year after Branwell's return came the news of Edmund Robinson's death. Branwell was overjoyed, and wrote to his friend Leyland, expressing his desire to be reunited with Mrs Robinson, now a wealthy widow:

I had reason to hope that ere long I should be the husband of a Lady I loved best in the world... I might live at leisure to try to make myself a name in the world of posterity, without being pestered by the small but countless botherments, which like mosquitoes sting us in the world of work-day toil.

However, Mrs Robinson made it clear that she was not going to marry Branwell, who subsequently descended into chronic alcoholism, opiate addiction and debt. Charlotte's letters from this time demonstrate that she was deeply angered by his behaviour.

After this, Branwell's behaviour became increasingly impossible and embarrassing to the family. On one occasion he set fire to his bed, after which his father had to sleep with him for the safety of the household. Towards the end of his life, Branwell was sending notes to a friend asking for: "Five pence (5d) worth of Gin". Charlotte wrote to her publisher that Branwell had died without "ever knowing that his sisters had published a line." However, there is some evidence that Branwell may have known about his sisters' publication of their work. Charlotte notes that some of her correspondence with her publisher had been opened when she received it, including a parcel of proofs. Some of Branwell's friends later claimed that he had boasted to them about Charlotte's success, and had claimed that he himself was the author of Wuthering Heights.

== Death ==
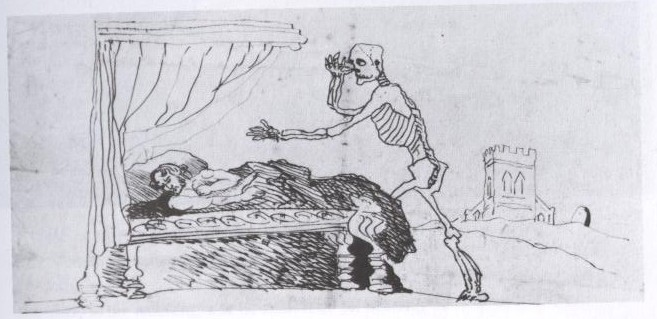
Self caricature of Branwell (1847) in bed waiting to die.

On 24 September 1848, Branwell died at Haworth parsonage, most likely due to tuberculosis aggravated by delirium tremens, alcoholism, and opium addiction, although his death certificate notes "chronic bronchitis-marasmus" as the cause. Elizabeth Gaskell's biography of Charlotte Brontë recounts an eye-witness report that Branwell, wanting to show the power of the human will, decided to die standing up, "and when the last agony began, he insisted on assuming the position just mentioned." On 28 September 1848, he was interred in the family vault.

In a letter, Charlotte writes of his death:

I do not weep from a sense of bereavement, but for the wreck of talent, the ruin of promise, the untimely dreary extinction of what might have been a burning and shining light. Til the last hour comes we never know how much we can forgive, pity, regret. All his vices were and are nothing now.

Emily Brontë died of tuberculosis on 19 December of that year and Anne Brontë died on 29 May 1849 in the coastal resort of Scarborough. Charlotte, the last living sister, married the Reverend Arthur Bell Nichols, curate of Haworth, in 1854 and died in March 1855, due to complications from pregnancy.

== Cultural references ==
Polly Teale wrote a 2005 play entitled Brontë about the three sisters, in which Branwell was portrayed as a drunk and jealous brother, soured by the growing successes of his sisters.

Blake Morrison wrote the play We are Three Sisters (2011), a re-working of Chekhov's Three Sisters based on the lives of the Brontë sisters and featuring Branwell and Mrs Robinson, which premiered in Halifax on 9 September before touring.

The British novelist Robert Edric wrote Sanctuary (2014), a novel chronicling Branwell's final months, during which family secrets are revealed and he learns about the publication of his sisters' books.

Branwell is referenced by the character "Mr Mybug" in Stella Gibbons's 1932 comic novel Cold Comfort Farm. In a parody of the "Hampstead intellectual" scene of the time of the book's creation, the Mr Mybug character boasts of working on a biography of Branwell Brontë, his thesis being that Branwell was in fact the real author of the books ascribed to his sisters.

In Tim Powers's novel My Brother’s Keeper (2023), Branwell is a major character, along with his sister Emily as the protagonist, as well as, to a lesser extent, the rest of the Brontë family.

=== Portrayals ===
In the 1946 film Devotion, Branwell was portrayed by Arthur Kennedy.

In the 1973 Yorkshire Television series The Brontës of Haworth, written by Christopher Fry, Branwell was played by Michael Kitchen.

In the film The Brontë Sisters (Les Sœurs Brontë, 1979) he was portrayed by Pascal Greggory.

Branwell was portrayed by Adam Nagaitis in To Walk Invisible (2016), a BBC drama about the Brontë family.

In the film Emily (2022) he was portrayed by Fionn Whitehead.

== Works ==
=== Poems ===
- "Lines Spoken by a Lawyer on the Occasion of the Transfer of This Magazine"
- "Lydia Gisborne"
- "On Caroline"
- "Thorp Green"
- "Remember Me"
- "Sir Henry Tunstall"
- "Penmaenmawr"
- "Real Rest"
- "Letter from a Father on Earth to His Child in Her Grave"
- "The End of All"

=== Juvenilia ===
(written with his sisters)

- Battell Book
- The Glass Town
- The Young Men's Magazine, Number 1 – 3 (August 1830)
- The Revenge A Tragedy
- The History of the Young Men from Their First Settlement to the Present Time (1829–1831)
- The Fate of Regina
- The Liar Detected
- Ode on the Celebration of the Great African Games
- The Pirate A Tale
- Real Life in Verdopolis, volume 1–2
- The Politics of Verdopolis
- An Angrain Battle Song
- Percy's Musings upon the Battle of Edwardston
- Mary's Prayer
- An Historical Narrative of the War of Encroachment
- An Historical Narrative of the War of Aggression
- Angria and the Angrians
- Letters from an Englishman (1830–1832)
- Life of Warner Howard Warner
- Tales of Angria (written 1838–1839 – a collection of childhood and young adult writings including five short novels)
