= Patrick Brontë =

Irish clergyman and writer (1777–1861)

The Reverend Patrick Brontë
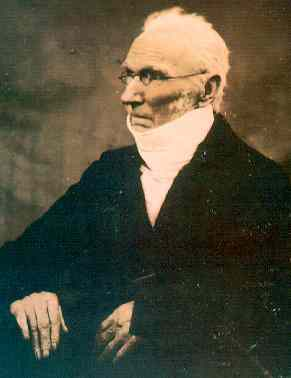
- Brontë, c. 1860
- Born: Patrick Brunty; 17 March 1777; Imdel, near Rathfriland, County Down, Ireland
- Died: 7 June 1861 (aged 84); Haworth, West Riding of Yorkshire, England
- Occupations: Teacher, clergyman
- Spouse: Maria Branwell (m. 1812; died 1821)
- Children: Maria Brontë; Elizabeth Brontë; Charlotte Brontë; Branwell Brontë; Emily Brontë; Anne Brontë

Patrick Brontë (/ˈbrɒnti/, commonly /-teɪ/; born Patrick Brunty; 17 March 1777 – 7 June 1861) was an Irish Anglican clergyman and author who spent most of his adult life in England. One of ten children from a very poor family, he managed to secure a scholarship to study theology at St John's College, Cambridge, and went on to take holy orders. In 1811 he published a collection of poetry, Cottage Poems. He continued to write and publish throughout his life. In 1812 he married Maria Branwell, and they had six children, including the writers Charlotte, Emily and Anne Brontë, and Branwell Brontë, their only son.

In 1820, the family moved to Haworth, where Patrick had been offered the role of perpetual curate. In 1821, Maria Branwell died, leaving Patrick to care for six children under eight. After the deaths of his two eldest daughters, Maria and Elizabeth, who had fallen ill at boarding school, Patrick looked after his children at home, with the help of his late wife's sister, Elizabeth Branwell, and the house servants.

Patrick was an abolitionist and a keen advocate for social reform. He died in 1861, aged eighty-four, having outlived all of his children.

== Early life ==
Ruins of the cottage in which Brontë was born in Imdel, County Down

Patrick Brontë was born on St Patrick's Day, 17 March 1777, at Imdel (or Emdale) in the parish of Drumballyroney, County Down. He was the eldest of ten children. His parents were Hugh Brunty (or Prunty), an Anglican, and Elinor Alice (née McClory), an Irish Catholic. His father was described as a "farmhand, fence-fixer and road-builder". The family was very poor, owning four books (including two copies of the Bible) and subsisting on a restricted diet of porridge, buttermilk, bread, and potatoes, to which Patrick attributed his lifelong digestive issues.

Patrick had several apprenticeships (to a blacksmith, aged twelve, then to a linen draper, and a weaver), until he was befriended by a local clergyman, who saw his potential and provided him with an education. In 1798 he became a teacher, then in 1802 moved to England, having won a scholarship to study theology as a sizar at St John's College, Cambridge. He first registered his name as "Branty" or "Brunty", then later as "Brontë", receiving his BA degree in 1806. While the reason for this change of spelling remains unclear, there are a number of prominent theories to explain it, including that it may have been in tribute to his hero, Lord Nelson, who had received the title Duke of Bronte.

== Career ==
=== Ordination ===
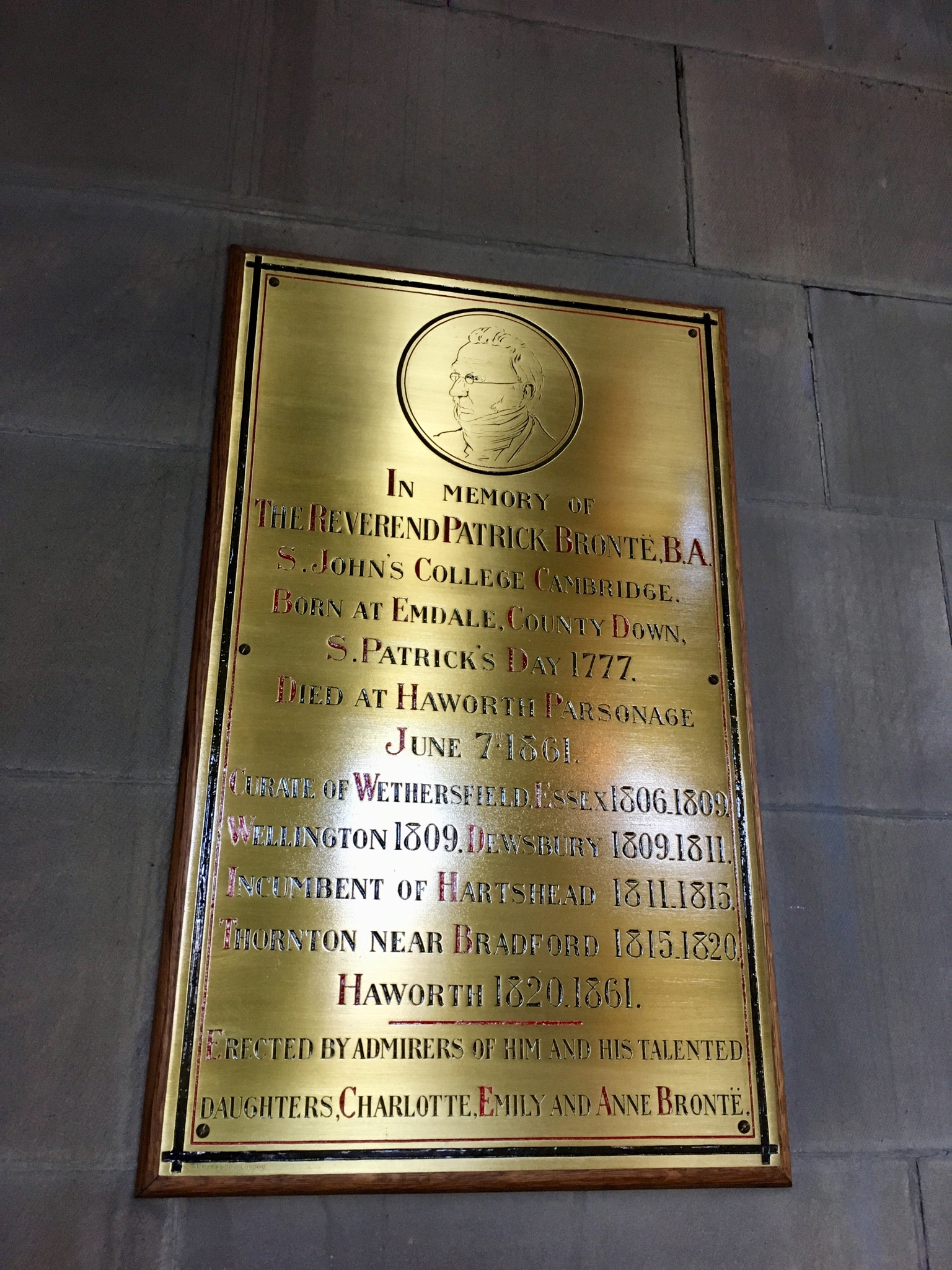
Memorial plaque to Patrick Brontë at Dewsbury Minster in West Yorkshire

in 1806 Patrick Brontë was ordained deacon in the Church of England, and became a priest in 1807. His first post on ordination as deacon was as curate at St Mary Magdalene Church, Wethersfield, Essex where the vicar was Joseph Jowett, Regius Professor of Law at Cambridge. Here in 1807 he met and fell in love with Mary Burder, the 18-year-old niece of his landlady. Mary's family were members of the dissenting or non-conformist Congregational Church, and objected to the connection. After a disagreement with Mary's uncle, who was her legal guardian, Patrick ended the relationship. Mary was sent away, and Patrick decided it was best to take a new curacy.

=== Poetry ===
In 1809, Patrick became assistant curate of Wellington, Shropshire, and in 1810 his first published poem, the 256-line Winter Evening Thoughts, appeared in a local newspaper. In 1811 he published a collection of moral verses, Cottage Poems, intended for ordinary people. In her biography of Charlotte Brontë, Claire Harman recounts that one of the Cottage Poems had been written to Mary Burder, and praised her sparkling blue eyes. Patrick later gave a copy of the book, with an annotated version of the poem, to another young lady, changing the line to "sparkling hazle eye". In 1813 he published The Rural Minstrel: A Miscellany of Descriptive Poems, and went on to publish The Cottage In the Wood in 1816, then a novel, The Maid of Killarney (1818) and The Signs of the Times (1835).

=== Dewsbury ===
In December 1809, Patrick moved to the West Riding of Yorkshire as curate at All Saints, Dewsbury (now Dewsbury Minster). The area was undergoing an evangelical revival under the incumbent vicar, John Buckworth. Brontë taught reading and writing at Dewsbury's Sunday School and was deputed by Buckworth to attend twice-weekly meetings of the Church Mission Society on his behalf. A memorial plaque to Brontë can be found in the south aisle of Dewsbury Minster.

Buckworth appointed Patrick as perpetual curate of the Church of St Peter, Hartshead, a daughter church of Dewsbury, in 1811. He served there until 1815. In 1812 he was appointed school examiner at a Wesleyan academy, Woodhouse Grove School, near Guiseley. In 1815 he moved again to become perpetual curate of Thornton.

=== Marriage to Maria Branwell ===
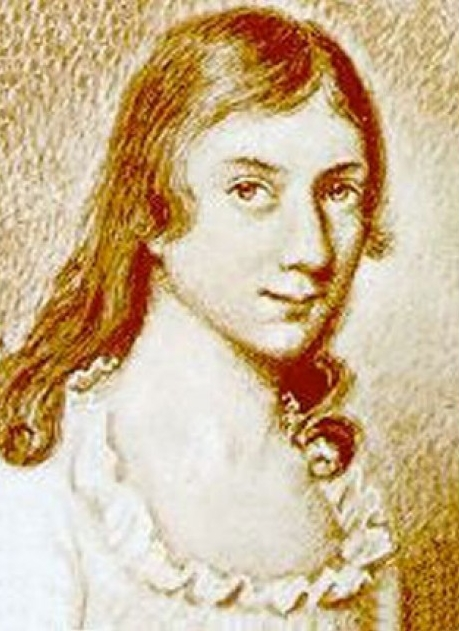
Maria Branwell

At Guiseley, Patrick met Maria Branwell (1783–1821), the daughter of a wealthy merchant and civic leader from Penzance. Maria was twenty-nine, and Patrick six years her senior, and they rapidly fell in love. Patrick is reported to have frequently made the twenty-four-mile (39 km) round trip from Hartshead to visit Maria, and Maria often wrote to Patrick, addressing him in one letter as "my dear saucy Pat".

The couple were married on 29 December 1812 in the Church of St Oswald. They moved into a house on Halifax Road, Liversedge, where their first two children, Maria (1814–1825) and Elizabeth (1815–1825), were born. In 1816 they moved to Thornton, where their four other children, Charlotte (1816–1855), Patrick Branwell (1817–1848), Emily (1818–1848), and Anne (1820–1849), were born.

=== Haworth ===
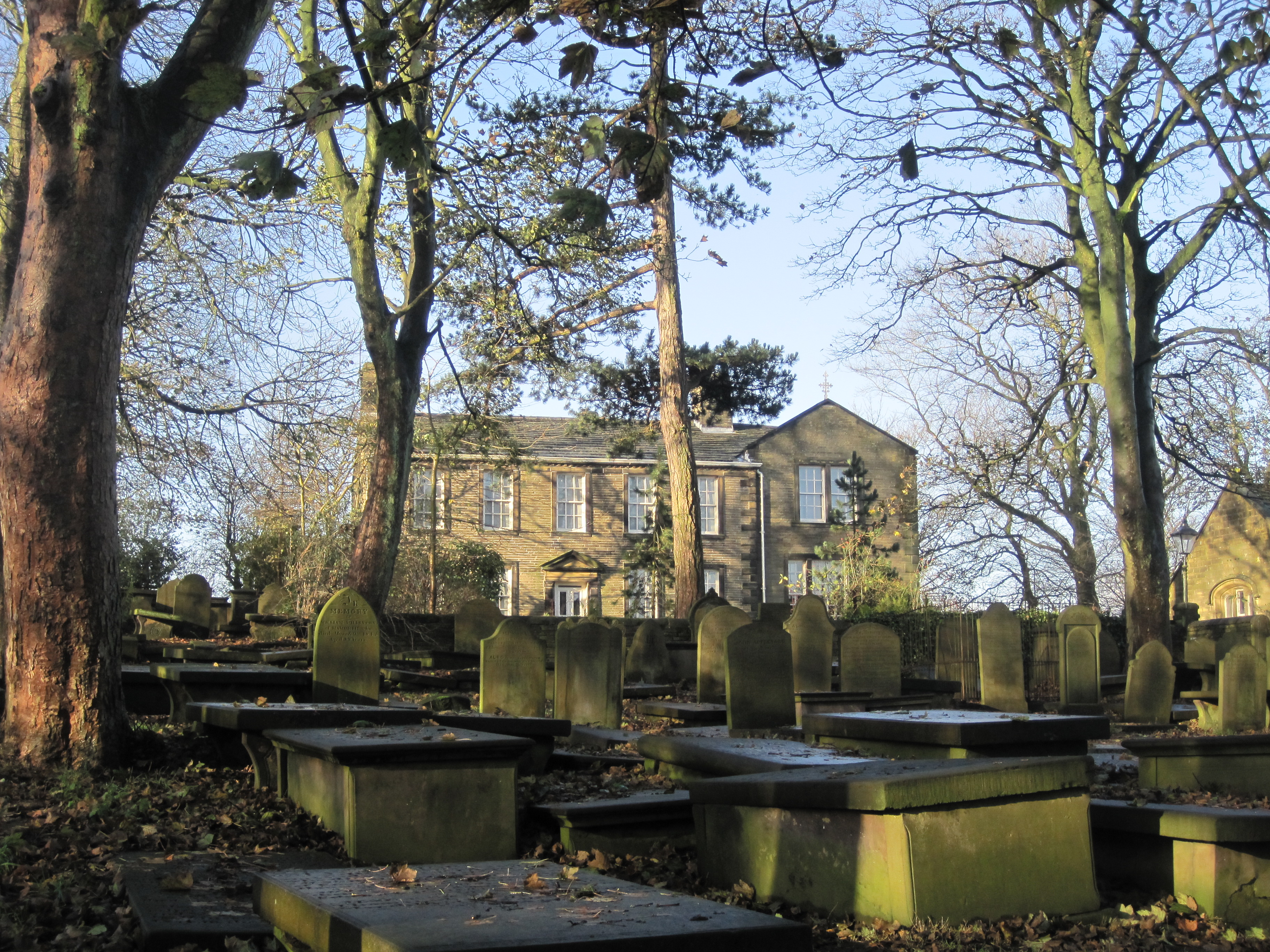
The Parsonage at Haworth

in June 1819, Patrick Brontë was offered the perpetual curacy of St Michael and All Angels' Church, Haworth, and in April 1820 he moved with his young family into the eight-roomed Haworth Parsonage. At this time, Haworth was notorious for its high death rate and poor sanitation; in 1850 Benjamin Babbage released a damning report, with accounts of appalling conditions, including open sewers, refuse in the streets and a water supply that was contaminated by run-off from the overcrowded cemetery. Throughout his years in Haworth, Patrick campaigned – against some opposition – for reform, calling for better sanitation, education and working conditions.

=== Death of Maria Branwell Brontë ===
In 1821 Patrick's sister-in-law Elizabeth Branwell (1776–1842), who had lived with the family at Thornton in 1815, joined the household to help to look after the children and to care for their mother, who had fallen seriously ill soon after their arrival. In September, after a long illness, Maria Branwell Brontë died from what may have been uterine cancer or ovarian cancer, leaving Patrick a widower with six children, all under eight years old, and with significant debts incurred from the doctors' fees and nursing expenses during Maria's illness. Maria's annuity of £50 a year had ceased with her death, and Patrick's salary amounted to only £170 a year. Friends and benefactors raised money to enable Patrick to pay his debts, but Elizabeth Branwell did not intend to remain in Haworth, which would leave only the house servants, Nancy and Sarah Garrs, to care for his children.

=== Attempts to remarry ===
Three months after Maria's death, Patrick proposed marriage to Elizabeth Firth, the twenty-four-year-old daughter of a wealthy friend from Thornton, and godmother to two of his daughters. Elizabeth was deeply offended by the proposal and severed ties with the family. Patrick then sought out Mary Burder, whom he had jilted fifteen years previously, offering marriage and describing his circumstances. Burder, who was still single, declined his offer. Although the refusal had been decisive, Patrick persisted, writing to her:

You may think and write as you please, but I have not the least doubt that if you had been mine you would have been happier than you now are, or can be as one in single life.

Other attempts to find a new wife were equally unsuccessful, and Patrick finally came to terms with widowhood at the age of forty-seven. He spent his time visiting the sick and the poor, giving sermons and communion, leaving the six children in the care of their aunt Elizabeth Branwell, who had agreed to stay on to help, and a maid, Tabitha "Tabby" Ackroyd, who recounted local legends in her Yorkshire dialect while preparing the meals.

=== Deaths of Maria and Elizabeth ===
With only his curate's salary, Patrick was keenly aware of the need to avoid unnecessary expense. In 1824, he sent his daughters Maria, Elizabeth, Emily and Charlotte to board at the newly opened Clergy Daughters' School at Cowan Bridge. Conditions at the school were poor, with insufficient, badly-prepared food and frequent outbreaks of disease. In 1825, the two eldest daughters, Maria and Elizabeth, were sent home ill after an outbreak of typhus, and both died shortly afterwards of tuberculosis. Following this, Patrick removed Charlotte and Emily from the school, and the siblings were subsequently educated at home.

=== Family ===
As an Irish immigrant, Patrick attracted prejudice and hostility in Haworth. At the time, Irish people were often seen as feckless and lazy, and Patrick faced hostility and rumours that he was an alcoholic. He had retained a strong Irish accent, which his children shared, adding to their sense of isolation from the community.

He was an affectionate father, going on walks with his children, supplying them with toys and books, and encouraging them to read and to take an interest in literature and politics. He educated his son Branwell at home, teaching him in Latin, Greek and mathematics, and providing him with tutors in music and painting. He provided the toy soldiers which gave birth to the siblings' creation of the fictional lands of Angria and Gondal, which in turn formed their development as writers.

In a letter to Gaskell, he recounts a game he played with the children when they were young, during which he gave each child a mask to wear, and asked them to answer questions from behind it. He asked Anne (who was four years old):

...what a child like her most wanted; she answered, 'Age and experience.' I asked the next (Emily) what I had best do with her brother Branwell, who was sometimes a naughty boy; she answered, 'Reason with him, and when he won’t listen to reason, whip him.' I asked Branwell what was the best way of knowing the difference between the intellect of men and women, he answered, 'By considering the difference between them as to their bodies.' I then asked Charlotte what was the best book in the world; she answered, 'The Bible.' And what was the next best; she answered, 'The Book of Nature.'

Although he expected his daughters to seek employment as teachers or governesses, Patrick encouraged Branwell to look for a career in the arts. An enthusiastic poet himself, Patrick had high hopes for Branwell, which were disappointed by Branwell's decline into alcoholism and opium addiction.

=== Health ===
Although his health was generally robust, Patrick was short-sighted, and suffered increasing problems with his vision as he grew older. In August 1846 he travelled to Manchester with Charlotte to undergo surgery on his eyes. On 28 August he was operated upon, without anaesthetic, to remove cataracts. Eye surgery was then in its infancy and surgeons did not understand how stitches could be used to hold together the necessary incision in the eye. Their solution was to have the patient undergo a long period of recuperation in a dark room. Charlotte used this interval of a month to begin writing Jane Eyre.

== Legacy ==
After Charlotte's death, Patrick Brontë co-operated with Elizabeth Gaskell on her biography of his daughter. He was also in part responsible for the posthumous publication of Charlotte's first novel, The Professor, in 1857. Charlotte's husband, Arthur Bell Nicholls (1819–1906), Patrick's curate, stayed in the household until after Patrick's death in 1861, at the age of eighty-four. Patrick Brontë outlived not only his wife (by forty years) but all six of his children.

=== Character ===
Elizabeth Gaskell's biography The Life of Charlotte Brontë was for many years the primary source of information about Patrick Brontë, although it contains many inconsistencies, exaggerations, and omissions. In her book, Gaskell portrays Patrick as a remote, tyrannical, eccentric character, with a volatile temper, describing him as a 'domestic hyena.' She also states that Patrick had no Irish accent when she met him, and wrongly claims that he did not keep in touch with his family in Ireland. She portrays him as a strict parent, and records the account of a former servant that he had burnt some coloured shoes that had been given to the children and sawed the backs from chairs because they were too ornate,although the house servant, Nancy Garrs, and Patrick himself denied this. Other reports from Gaskell include accounts of Patrick firing his gun from the Parsonage window every day, 'to work off his volcanic wrath', and denying his children meat – both claims strenuously denied by Patrick. He did carry a gun – since the Luddite riots he had felt the need for personal protection – but Gaskell and subsequent writers may have misrepresented his motives.

Other sources describe Patrick as a striking man, with red hair and glasses, often wearing a high neckerchief for fear of catching bronchitis.Family servants, as well as Patrick's friends, describe him as being affable and kind, although he is also described in his professional life as being hot-tempered and impulsive. One Dewsbury lawyer recalls an episode where Patrick threw a drunkard, who was trying to disrupt a Sunday procession, into a ditch; another remembers him saving a boy from drowning in a river, even though he himself could not swim.

Patrick was a passionate advocate for social reform, and was responsible for the building of a Sunday school in Haworth, which he opened in 1832. He was a fervent abolitionist, and remained active in local causes into his old age. Between 1849 and 1850, he organised action to procure a clean water supply for the village, which was eventually achieved in 1856.

== Publications ==
- Winter Evening Thoughts (1810)
- Cottage Poems (1810)
- The Rural Minstrel: A Miscellany of Descriptive Poems (1813)
- The Cottage In the Wood (1816)
- The Maid of Killarney (1818)
- The Signs of the Times (1835)

== Portrayals ==
- Montagu Love portrayed Patrick Brontë in Devotion (1946)
- Alfred Burke portrayed Patrick Brontë in The Brontës of Haworth (1973)
- Patrick Magee portrayed Patrick Brontë in The Brontë Sisters (1979)
- Jonathan Pryce portrayed Patrick Brontë in To Walk Invisible (2016)
- Adrian Dunbar portrayed Patrick Brontë in Emily (2022)
