= Bradley (given name) =

- Pronunciation: /ˈbrædli/
- Gender: Male

Origin
- Origin: Old English, Irish
- Meaning: "broad wood", "broad clearing"
- Region of origin: England, Ireland

Bradley is an English given name derived from a placename meaning "broad wood" or "broad meadow" in Old English.

The given name Brad is often a diminutive of Bradley. It is also a surname.

Notable people with the given name include:

== A ==
- Bradley Abelow (born 1958), American businessman
- Bradley Adams, British film producer
- Bradley Adkins (born 1993), American track and field athlete
- Bradley Allen (born 1971), English footballer and coach
- Bradley Ally (born 1986), Barbadian swimmer
- Bradley Alpert, American scientist
- Bradley Anderson, American politician
- Bradley Anholt, Canadian ecologist
- Bradley Shavit Artson (born 1959), American rabbi
- Bradley August (born 1978), South African football

== B ==
- Bradley Banda (born 1998), Gibraltarian footballer
- Bradley Barcola (born 2002), French footballer
- Bradley Barker (1883–1951), American actor
- Bradley Barlow (1814–1889), American politician
- Bradley Barnes (born 1988), South African cricketer
- Bradley Barrett, American politician
- Bradley Barry (born 1995), English footballer
- Bradley Battersby (born 1953), American film director and screenwriter
- Bradley Beal (born 1993), American basketball player
- Bradley Beattie (born 1957), English footballer
- Bradley Beaulieu (born 1968), American fantasy writer
- Bradley Becker, U.S. Army general
- Bradley Beesley, American film director
- Bradley Bell (born 1964), American television writer and producer
- Bradley Bell (musician) (born 1983), American musician
- Bradley Belt, American businessman and government official
- Bradley M. Berkson (born 1963), American businessman and former government official
- Bradley Bernstein (born 1970), Biologist
- Bradley Billington (born 1970), British table tennis player
- Bradley Birkenfeld (born 1965), American banker and whistleblower
- Bradley J. Birzer (born 1967), American historian
- Bradley Blalock (born 2000), American baseball player
- Bradley Bolke (1925–2019), American voice actor
- Bradley Bourgeois (born 1994), American soccer player
- Bradley Bozeman (born 1994), American football player
- Bradley Brooks (born 2000), English darts player
- Bradley Brookshire (born 1959), American musician
- Bradley Bubb (born 1988), Footballer
- Bradley A. Buckles (born 1999), Fifth Director of the Bureau of Alcohol, Tobacco and Firearms
- Bradley Buckman (born 1984), American basketball player
- Bradley Buecker, American television and film director
- Bradley Bunch (1818–1894), Arkansas politician
- Bradley Burrowes (born 2008), English footballer
- Bradley Burston, Israeli journalist
- Bradley Byquar, Australian actor and dancer
- Bradley Byrne (born 1955), American politician and attorney

== C ==
- Bradley Cachopa (born 1988), New Zealand cricketer
- Bradley M. Campbell (born 1961), American lawyer
- Bradley Cantrell (born 1975), American architect
- Bradley Cardinale (born 1969), American ecologist and conservation biologist
- Bradley Carnell (born 1977), South African soccer player and coach
- Bradley Carrott (1920–2001), Antiguan politician
- Bradley B. Chambers (born 1964), American businessman and politician
- Bradley Chubb (born 1996), American football player
- Bradley Clyde (born 1970), Australia international rugby league footballer
- Bradley Cole (born 1959), American actor
- Bradley Collins (born 1997), English footballer
- Bradley Cooper (born 1975), American actor and filmmaker
- Bradley Cooper (athlete) (born 1957), Bahamian discus thrower and shot putter
- Bradley Cross (soccer) (born 2001), South African soccer player
- Bradley Crowell, American policy advisor

== D ==
- Bradley Dack (born 1993), English footballer
- Bradley Danger (born 1998), French footballer
- Bradley Davids, South African rugby union player
- Bradley Davies (born 1987), Wales international rugby union player
- Bradley Moore Davis (1871–1957), American botanist
- Bradley Dean (born 1970), American stage and screen actor
- Bradley Deitz (born 1995), Australian rugby league footballer
- Bradley Denton (born 1958), American science fiction author
- Bradley Dial (born 1995), South African cricketer
- Bradley Diallo (born 1990), French footballer
- Bradley Donaldson (born 1994), Scottish footballer
- Bradley Dowden (born 1942), American philosopher
- Bradley Dredge (born 1973), Welsh professional golfer

== E ==
- Bradley C. Edwards, US physicist
- Bradley J. Edwards, American attorney
- Bradley Efron (born 1938), American statistician
- Bradley Ellingboe (born 1958), American composer
- Bradley Erasmus (born 1988), South African baseball player
- Bradley Erickson (born 2006), American racing driver
- Bradley Eros (born 1952), American film director

== F ==
- Bradley Felix, Saint Lucian politician
- Bradley Fewster (born 1996), English footballer
- Bradley Fields (1951–2020), American magician
- Bradley Fink (born 2003), Swiss footballer
- Bradley J. Fischer (born 1976), American film producer
- Bradley Fish (born 1970), American musician
- Bradley A. Fiske (1854–1942), United States Navy admiral
- Bradley Fletcher (born 1986), American football player
- Bradley Flick (born 1964), American aerospace engineer
- Bradley Forbes-Cryans (born 1995), British slalom canoeist
- Bradley R. Fox, Bahamian politician
- Bradley Freegard (born 1976), Welsh actor
- Bradley Fried (born 1965), British businessman
- Bradley Fritts, American politician

== G ==
- Bradley Gamble (born 1975), English footballer
- Bradley Game (born 1995), Australian BMX rider
- Bradley Garmston (born 1994), Footballer
- Bradley Garrett (born 1981), American social and cultural geographer
- Bradley Gaskin, American country music singer-songwriter
- Bradley Gericke (born 1965), U.S. Army general
- Bradley M. Glass (1931–2015), American politician
- Bradley Goldberg (born 1993), English footballer
- Bradley Goodyear (1885–1959), American lawyer and soldier
- Bradley Grace (born 1982), Irish musician
- Bradley F. Granger (1825–1882), American politician
- Bradley Gray (born 1990), English footballer
- Bradley Rust Gray (born 1971), American filmmaker
- Bradley Grayson (born 1994), English footballer
- Bradley S. Greenberg (1934–2018), American communications theorist
- Bradley Gregg (born 1966), American actor
- Bradley Trevor Greive (born 1970), Australian author
- Bradley Grobler (born 1988), South African soccer player
- Bradley Groves (born 1982), Australian soccer player
- Bradley Gunter (born 1993), Canadian volleyball player

== H ==
- Bradley Halsman (born 1993), Scottish footballer
- Bradley Hamilton (born 1992), English footballer
- Bradley Maxon Hamlett, American legislator
- Bradley Hanner (born 1999), American baseball player
- Bradley Hansell, US government official
- Bradley Hart, Canadian contemporary artist
- Bradley Hathaway (born 1982), American musician
- Bradley Hauser (born 1977), American long-distance runner
- Bradley Heithold (born 1956), United States Air Force general
- Bradley Hill (footballer) (born 1993), Australian rules footballer
- Bradley Hope (born 1999), Australian cricketer
- Bradley Hore (born 1981), Australian boxer
- Bradley Horowitz (born 1965), American businessman
- Bradley C. Hosmer (born 1937), United States Air Force general
- Bradley Hudson-Odoi (born 1988), Ghanaian footballer
- Bradley Hughes (golfer) (born 1967), Australian professional golfer
- Bradley Hyman, American academic

== I ==
- Bradley Ibrahim (born 2004), English football player
- Bradley Ihionvien (born 2003), English footballer
- Bradley Iles (born 1983), New Zealand golfer
- Bradley Inman, American entrepreneur and author

== J ==
- Bradley Jaden (born 1988), English actor
- Bradley James (born 1983), English actor
- Bradley S. James, U.S. Marine Corps general
- Bradley Jennings (1977–2025), American football player
- Bradley D. Jesson (1932–2016), American judge
- Bradley S. Jewitt (born 1969), Former Mayor and Councilmember for the Town of Berwyn Heights, Maryland
- Bradley Johnson (born 1987), English footballer
- Bradley Tyler Johnson (1829–1903), Confederate Army general
- Bradley Jones Jr. (born 1965), American politician
- Bradley Jones (snooker player) (born 1974), English snooker player
- Bradley Joseph (born 1965), American composer and producer

== K ==
- Bradley Kamdem (born 1994), French footballer
- Bradley Kasal (born 1966), United States Marine
- Bradley Kendell (born 1981), American Paralympic sailor
- Bradley Kilgore, American chef
- Bradley Kilpatrick, Australian army officer and former actor
- Bradley Kincaid (1895–1989), American folk singer and radio entertainer
- Bradley King (lighting designer), American theatrical lighting designer
- Bradley King (filmmaker), American film director and screenwriter
- Bradley Klahn (born 1990), American tennis player
- Bradley S. Klein (born 1954), American political scientist
- Bradley Kochmit, American musician
- Bradley Kruger (born 1988), Netherlands cricketer
- Bradley M. Kühn (born 1973), American free software activist

== L ==
- Bradley Langenhoven (born 1983), Namibia international rugby union player
- Bradley J. LaRose (born 1957), US Marshal for Vermont
- Bradley Last, American politician and a Republican member of the Utah House of Representatives
- Bradley Lavelle (1958–2007), Canadian actor
- Bradley LeCroy (born 1979), American baseball coach
- Bradley Lequin (born 1998), Canadian curler
- Bradley Lethbridge (born 2000), English footballer
- Bradley C. Livezey (1954–2011), American ornithologist
- Bradley Locko (born 2002), French footballer
- Bradley Lord (figure skater) (1939–1961), American figure skater
- Bradley Lord (motorsport), British motorsports executive
- Bradley Lynch (born 1997), South African cricketer

== M ==
- Bradley M'bondo (born 2001), French footballer
- Bradley Mark (born 1957), New Zealand Paralympic shooter
- Bradley Marquez (born 1992), American football player
- Bradley Marshall, American politician
- Bradley Martin (1841–1913), American socialite
- Bradley Martis (born 1998), Aruban footballer
- Bradley Mazikou (born 1996), Footballer
- Bradley McCallum (born 1966), American artist
- Bradley McCuaig (born 1970), Canadian sprinter
- Bradley McDougald (born 1990), American football player
- Bradley McGee (born 1976), Australian cyclist
- Bradley McIntosh (born 1981), British-Jamaican singer, rapper and actor
- Bradley McStravick (1956–2024), British decathlete
- Bradley B. Meeker (1813–1873), American jurist, lawyer, and businessman
- Bradley Michalaro (born 1971), South African field hockey player
- Bradley W. Miller (born 1968), Canadian jurist
- Bradley Mills (born 1983), Canadian ice hockey player
- Bradley J. Monk, American gynecologic oncologist
- Bradley Moolman (born 1991), South African rugby union player
- Bradley Mousley (born 1996), Australian tennis player
- Bradley John Murdoch (1958–2025), Australian murderer

== N ==
- Bradley Neil (born 1996), Scottish golfer
- Bradley Nelson (born 1962), American roboticist
- Bradley Nkoana (born 2005), South African athlete
- Bradley de Nooijer (born 1997), Dutch footballer
- Bradley Norton (born 1991), Australian soccer player
- Bradley Nowell (1968–1996), American musician

== O ==
- Bradley Ogden, American chef
- Bradley Orr (born 1982), English footballer
- Bradley Osborne (born 1962), South African cricketer

== P ==
- Bradley Page (1901–1985), American actor
- Bradley Palmer (1866–1946), American attorney and businessman
- Bradley Parker (born 1970), English cricketer
- Bradley Paul (born 1972), American poet and screenwriter
- Bradley L. Pentelute (born 1976), American biochemist
- Bradley Steven Perry (born 1998), American actor
- Bradley Peters (poet), Canadian poet
- Bradley Peterson, American psychiatrist, developmental neuroscientist
- Bradley Dale Peveto (born 1962), American football player and coach
- Bradley Phillips (Wisconsin minister) (1818–1904), American Presbyterian minister and politician
- Bradley Philpot (born 1985), British racing driver
- Bradley G. Pieper (born 1942), American businessman and politician
- Bradley Pierce (born 1982), American actor
- Bradley Pinion (born 1994), American football player
- Bradley Plain (born 1969), Australian rules footballer
- Bradley Player (born 1967), South African cricketer
- Bradley F. Podliska, American author and intelligence analyst
- Bradley Porteous (born 1998), South African cricketer
- Bradley Potgieter (born 1989), South African cyclist
- Bradley Pritchard (born 1985), Zimbabwean footballer
- Bradley Pryce (born 1981), Wales boxer
- Bradley L. Pyburn, U.S. Air Force general

== Q ==
- Bradley Quinn (born 1976), British photographer

== R ==
- Bradley Ralph (born 1969), American attorney and politician
- Bradley Randle (born 1990), American football player
- Bradley Ray (born 1997), British motorcycle racer
- Bradley Raymond (born 1973), America film director
- Bradley Rea (born 1998), English boxer
- Bradley Read (born 1995), New Zealand field hockey player
- Bradley Riches (born 2001), English actor
- Bradley Riethmeyer (born 1984), American racing driver
- Bradley Ritson (born 1982), South African soccer player
- Bradley Roberts (rugby union) (born 1996), Wales international rugby union player
- Bradley Roberts (Bahamian politician) (1943–2018), Bahamian politician
- Bradley Roberts (American politician) (1908–1976), American lawyer and politician
- Bradley Robinson (Canadian football) (born 1985), American gridiron football player
- Bradley Robinson (cricketer) (born 1975), Zimbabwean cricketer
- Bradley Robinson (bowls) (born 1983), South African lawn bowler
- Bradley Roby (born 1992), American football player
- Bradley M. Rockwood (born 1862), American politician
- Bradley Rodden (born 1989), New Zealand cricketer
- Bradley Ross (1963–1990), Australian rules footballer
- Bradley Rothwell (born 2004), New Zealand field hockey player
- Bradley Rubenstein (born 1963), American painter and writer

== S ==
- Bradley Sack (1935–2017), American physician and researcher
- Bradley Sample (born 2000), American soccer player
- Bradley Sandeman (born 1970), English footballer
- Bradley Sands (born 1978), American author and editor
- Bradley Santer (born 1982), Australian figure skater
- Bradley V. Sargent Jr. (1863–1940), American politician
- Bradley Varnum Sargent (1828–1893), American pioneer and politician
- Bradley Saunders (born 1986), British boxer
- Bradley Schaefer (born 1953), American astronomer
- Bradley Schafferius (born 1960), Australian sailor
- Bradley W. Schenck (born 1950), American artist and game designer
- Bradley Schlozman (born 1971), American attorney
- Bradley Scott (cricketer) (born 1979), New Zealand cricketer
- Bradley Scriven (born 1993), English cricketer
- Bradley Selway (1955–2005), Australian judge
- Bradley Shaw (born 1983), New Zealand field hockey player
- Bradley Sheridan (born 1980), Australian basketball player
- Bradley Marc Sherrill (born 1958), Professor of Physics at Michigan State University
- Bradley Sherwood (born 1999), South African field hockey player
- Bradley Simmons (born 1955), American sports shooter
- Bradley D. Simon, American lawyer
- Bradley Singh (born 1980), South African politician
- Bradley Skaught (born 1976), American singer-songwriter
- Bradley Skeete (born 1987), English boxer
- Bradley Slagh, American politician
- Bradley Slater (born 1998), New Zealand rugby union player
- Bradley Smalley (1835–1909), American politician
- Bradley Smith (motorcyclist) (born 1990), British motorcycle racer
- Bradley Smith (law professor) (born 1958), American political scientist
- Bradley Smith (racing driver) (born 1991), British racing driver
- Bradley Smith (cricketer) (born 1969), English cricketer
- Bradley Smith (photographer) (1910–1997), American magazine photographer, writer and photojournalist
- Bradley D. Smith (born 1961), Chemistry and biochemistry professor
- Bradley Snedeker (born 1977), American actor
- Bradley Snyder (shot putter) (born 1976), Canadian shot putter
- Bradley Soileau (born 1986), American model, DJ, producer, and designer
- Bradley Sowell (born 1989), American football player
- Bradley Sparks (born 1967), Australian rules footballer
- Bradley Spence, British music producer
- Bradley Steffens (born 1955), American writer
- Bradley Stephens (born 1963), American politician from Illinois
- Bradley Stevenson (born 1998), English footballer
- Bradley P. Stoner (born 1959), American anthropologist
- Bradley R. Straatsma (1927–2026), American ophthalmologist
- Bradley Streit (1892–1978), American football player
- Bradley Stryker (born 1977), American actor
- Bradley Swanson, U.S. Air Force general
- Bradley Sylve (born 1993), American football player

== T ==
- Bradley Tarbuck (born 1995), English footballer
- Bradley Theodore, Visual artist
- Brad Thiessen (curler) (born 1990), Canadian curler
- Bradley Thiessen (statistician), American statistician and academic administrator
- Bradley Thomas (athlete) (born 1967), Australian Paralympic athlete
- Bradley Thomas (footballer)
- Bradley Thomas (producer) (born 1965), American film and television producer
- Bradley Thomas (British politician), British politician
- Bradley Thompson (born 1953), American television writer and producer
- Bradley Tippett (born 1988), Australian baseball player
- Bradley Walker Tomlin (1899–1953), American painter
- Bradley Tovosia (born 1967), Solomon Islands politician
- Bradley Tusk (born 1973), American businessman and political strategist

== V ==
- Bradley Vierling (born 1986), American football player
- Bradley Vincent (born 1991), South African-Mauritian swimmer
- Bradley Vliet (born 1998), Dutch footballer

== W ==
- Bradley Wadlan (born 1988), Welsh cricketer
- Bradley Walker (1877–1951), American athlete and attorney
- Bradley Walker (singer) (born 1978), American country vocalist
- Bradley Walsh (born 1960), English actor, singer and television presenter
- Bradley C. S. Watson, Canadian-born American political science educator
- Bradley Webb (born 2001), English footballer
- Bradley Welch (born 1989), Footballer
- Bradley White (born 1982), American cyclist
- Bradley Whitford (born 1959), American actor
- Bradley Wiggins (born 1980), British former professional road and track racing cyclist
- Bradley R. Wilcox (born 1959), American professor
- Bradley Williams (footballer) (born 2004), English footballer
- Bradley Willman (born 1980), Canadian anti-pedophile activist
- Bradley Wilson-Dean (born 1994), New Zealand speedway rider
- Bradley Wilson (freestyle skier) (born 1992), American freestyle skier
- Bradley Winslow (1831–1914), American soldier and politician
- Bradley Wood (born 1991), English footballer
- Bradley Woods-Garness (born 1986), English-born Montserratian footballer
- Bradley Woodward (born 1998), Australian swimmer
- Bradley Wright-Phillips (born 1985), English footballer

== Y ==
- Bradley Yaeger (born 1985), Canadian ice dancer

== Z ==
- Bradley Zimmer (born 1992), American baseball player

== Fictional characters ==
- Bradley Baker, in the US TV soap opera The Bold and the Beautiful
- Bradley Biggle, in the US adult animated sitcom South Park
- Bradley Bottig, in the US TV sitcom The Middle
- Bradley Bradshaw, in the 2022 US action drama film Top Gun: Maverick
- Bradley Branning, in the UK TV soap opera EastEnders
- Bradley Fine, in the 2015 US film Spy
- Bradley Foster, in the UK soap opera Family Affairs
- Bradley Fox (Neighbours), in the Australian TV soap opera Neighbours
- Bradley Glenn, in The New 52 DC Comics
- Bradley Gregory, in the US TV series Space Force
- Bradley Hewson, in the Australian TV soap opera Neighbours
- Bradley Hitler-Smith, in the US adult animated TV series BoJack Horseman
- Bradley Hume, in the UK medical drama TV series Holby City
- Bradley Jackson, in the US drama TV series The Morning Show
- Bradley Kroon, in Marvel Comics
- Bradley McGogg, the Very Fine Frog, in the 2009 Canadian children's book
- Bradley Satchwell, in the Australian TV soap opera Neighbours
- Bradley Townsend, in the Australian TV soap opera Neighbours
- Bradley Uppercrust III, in the 2000 US animated sports comedy film An Extremely Goofy Movie
- Bradley Vargas, in the US medical drama TV series The Good Doctor
- Bradley Ward, in the US daytime TV soap opera General Hospital

== See also ==
- Bradley (disambiguation)
- Bradley (surname)
