= Bradley =

Bradley may refer to:

== People ==
- Bradley (given name)
- Bradley (surname)
- Justice Bradley (disambiguation)

== Vehicles ==
- Bradley (automobile), a car manufactured in 1920–1921 in Cicero, Illinois, USA
- Bradley Automotive, a maker of kit cars
- Bradley Fighting Vehicle, armored fighting vehicle (M2 Bradley and M3 Bradley)
- USS Robert G. Bradley (FFG-49), an Oliver Hazard Perry-class frigate
- SS Carl D. Bradley, a lake freighter, wrecked on Lake Michigan November 18, 1958

== Places ==
=== In the United Kingdom ===
In England:

- Bradley, Cheshire, a former civil parish
- Bradley, Derbyshire
- Bradley, Gloucestershire
- Bradley, Hampshire
- Bradley, Huddersfield, West Yorkshire
- Bradley, Lincolnshire
- Bradley, North Yorkshire
- Bradley, Staffordshire
- Bradley (ward), ward in the Borough of Pendle, Lancashire
- Bradley, West Midlands
- Bradley in the Moors, Staffordshire
- Bradley Green, Cheshire
- Bradley Green, Gloucestershire
- Bradley Green, Worcestershire
- Bradley Stoke, Gloucestershire

In Wales:

- Bradley, Wrexham

=== In the United States ===
- Bradley, Arkansas
- Bradley, California
- Bradley Junction, Florida, also known as Bradley
- Bradley, Georgia
- Bradley, Illinois
- Bradley, Louisville, Kentucky
- Bradley, Maine, a New England town
  - Bradley (CDP), Maine, village in the town
- Bradley, Michigan
- Bradley, Nebraska
- Bradley, Ohio
- Bradley, Oklahoma
- Bradley, South Carolina
- Bradley, South Dakota
- Bradley, Boone County, West Virginia
- Bradley, Raleigh County, West Virginia
- Bradley, Wisconsin, a town
  - Bradley (community), Lincoln County, Wisconsin, within the town
- Bradley County, Arkansas
- Bradley County, Tennessee
- Bradley Township, Jackson County, Illinois

=== Other places ===
- Bradley Land, a phantom island in the Arctic reported by Frederick Cook

== Facilities and structures ==
- Bradley (house), a National Trust property in England
- Harold C. Bradley House in Madison, Wisconsin
- Bradley International Airport in Windsor Locks, Connecticut, USA
- Bradley Center, former arena located in Milwaukee, Wisconsin, USA

== Groups, organizations, companies ==
- Bradley Academy for the Visual Arts, York, Pennsylvania, USA
- Bradley Foundation, a conservative non-profit foundation in Milwaukee, Wisconsin
- Bradley Pharmaceuticals in New Jersey, USA
- Bradley University, Peoria, Illinois, USA
- W. C. Bradley Co. in Georgia, USA

== Other uses ==
- Bradley effect, a discrepancy between voter opinion polls and election outcomes in American elections
- The Bradley method of natural childbirth
- The Bradley method of bush regeneration

== See also ==
- Bradleys (disambiguation)
