= Brad (given name) =

Brad is a given name, usually a diminutive form (hypocorism) of Bradley, Bradford, or Brady. It is generally masculine. Notable people with the name include:

== Sports ==
- Brad Anae (born 1957), American football player
- Brad Ausmus (born 1969), American baseball player and manager
- Brad Beven (born 1969), Australian triathlete
- Brad Binder (born 1995), South African motorcycle racer
- Brad Boyes (born 1982), Canadian ice hockey player
- Brad Butterworth (born 1959), New Zealand yachtsman
- Brad Cecil (born 1999), American football player
- Brad Cooper (swimmer) (born 1954), Australian swimmer
- Brad Cooper (born 1959), Australian businessman who played a central role in the collapse of HIH Insurance
- Brad Cooper (admiral) (born 1967), United States Navy officer
- B. Cooper (Brad Alan Cooper, born 1984), American rapper
- Brad Cooper (General Hospital), a fictional character that has appeared in the TV series since 2013
- Brad Erdos (born 1990), Canadian football player
- Brad Farrow (born 1956), Canadian judoka
- Brad Firth (born c. 1971), Gwichʼin Canadian long-distance runner
- Brad Gilbert (born 1961), American tennis player and coach
- Brad Gobright (1988–2019), American rock climber
- Brad Goldberg (born 1990), American baseball pitcher
- Brad Hawpe (born 1979), American baseball player
- Brad Hogg (born 1970), Australian cricketer
- Brad Holland (born 1956), American basketball player and coach
- Brad Holmes (born 1979), American football executive
- Brad Idzik (born 1991), American football coach
- Brad Jackson (born 1975), American football player and coach
- Brad Jackson (quarterback) (born 2005), American football player
- Brad Johnson (American football) (born 1968), American football player
- Brad Kaaya (born 1995), American football player
- Brad Keselowski (born 1984), American NASCAR driver and team owner
- Brad Leaf (born 1960), Israeli-American basketball player
- Brad Lebo (born 1970), American football player
- Brad Leonard (born 1979), New Zealand cricketer
- Brad Loesing (born 1989), American basketball player
- Brad MacGregor (born 1964), Canadian ice hockey player
- Brad Maddox (born 1984), American professional wrestler
- Brad Mantsounga (born 2007), Congolese footballer
- Brad Marchand (born 1988), Canadian ice hockey player
- Brad McKay (footballer) (born 1993), Scottish football player
- Brad McStravick (1956-2024), British athlete
- Brad Newley (born 1985), Australian basketball player
- Brad Noffsinger (born 1960), American NASCAR driver
- Brad Pauls (born 1993), English professional boxer
- Brad Richards (born 1980), Canadian ice hockey player
- Brad Rowe (tennis) (born 1955), American tennis player
- Brad Rowe (footballer) (born 1969), Australian football player
- Brad Seaton (born 1993), American football player
- Brad Stevens (born 1976), American basketball coach
- Brad Strand (born 1997), English professional boxer
- Brad Thorn (born 1975), Australian rugby player
- Brad Tidrick (born 1955), American racing driver
- Brad Wilkerson (born 1977), American baseball player
- Brad Williams (cricketer) (born 1974), Australian cricketer
- Brad Williamson (ice hockey) (born 1977), Canadian ice hockey player
- Brad Williamson (basketball) (born 1981), Australian basketball player
- Brad Willock (born 1962), Canadian volleyball player
- Brad Wing (born 1991), American football player
- Brad Wright (basketball) (born 1962), American basketball player

== Arts and entertainment ==
- Brad Altman (born 1954), American producer and husband of actor George Takei
- Brad Arnold (1978–2026), American musician, 3 Doors Down singer
- Brad Bird (born 1957), American director
- Brad Carlson, also known as Bun E. Carlos (born 1950), American drummer
- Brad Delp (1951–2007), American singer and songwriter, member of the rock band Boston
- Brad Delson (born 1977), American guitarist
- Brad Dexter (1917–2002), American actor
- Brad Dourif (born 1950), American actor
- Brad Falchuk (born 1971), American director
- Brad Garrett (born 1960), American actor
- Brad Hall (born 1958), American screenwriter
- Brad Hargreaves (born 1971), American drummer
- Brad Kavanagh (born 1992), British actor
- Brad Mehldau (born 1970), American jazz pianist
- Bradley Nowell (born 1965), American punk rock songwriter
- Brad Paisley (born 1972), American country musician
- Brad Pitt (born 1963), American actor
- Brad Renfro (1982–2008), American actor
- Brad Roberts (born 1964), Canadian musician
- Brad Rowe (actor) (born 1970), American actor
- Brad Sherwood (born 1964), American comedian/actor
- Brad Silberling (born 1963), American director
- Brad Simpson (born 1995), British musician
- Brad Wilk (born 1968), American musician
- Brad Williams (puppeteer) (1951–1993), American puppet designer for TV programs and literacy education
- Brad Williams (comedian) (born 1984), American comedian and actor
- Brad Whitford (born 1952), American guitarist
- Bradley Whitford (born 1959), American actor sometimes credited as "Brad Whitford"
- Brad, nickname of John Bradbury (drummer) (1953-2015), best known as a member of English ska group The Specials

== Politics ==
- Brad Bailey (New Hampshire politician)
- Brad Bailey (Texas politician)
- Brad Cathers, Canadian politician
- Brad Christ, American politician
- Brad Ellsworth (born 1958), U.S. Representative from Indiana
- Brad Finstad (born 1976), Minnesota state representative
- Brad Hennen, Minnesota state representative
- Brad Henry (born 1963), Governor of Oklahoma
- Brad Hoylman (born 1965), New York state senator
- Brad Lander (born 1969), American politician
- Brad Raffensperger (born 1955), Georgia Secretary of State
- Brad Wall (born 1965), Premier of Saskatchewan

== Other ==
- Brad Colbert (born 1974), American Marine
- Brad Farmer (born c. 1959), Australian Marine Conservationist
- Brad Flora, American journalist and investor
- Brad Hawkins (disambiguation), multiple people
- Brad Keywell (born 1969), American billionaire entrepreneur
- Brad Lomax (1950–84), American human rights and disability activist
- Brad McKay (doctor) (born 1970), Australian medical doctor, skeptic, television personality and author
- Brad A. Myers (born 1956), American professor
- Brad Sigmon (born 1957), American convicted murderer
- Brad Williams (mnemonist) (born c. 1956), American, one of the only three people in the world with a condition called hyperthymestic syndrome

== Fictional characters ==
- Brad, in the Canadian-produced sitcom Learning the Ropes, played by Gordon Michael Woolvett
- Brad, in the US TV miniseries V (1983 miniseries), played by William Russ
- Brad Anderson, in the 1987 US teen comedy film Adventures in Babysitting, played by Keith Coogan
- Brad Armstrong, in the 2014 post-apocalyptic role-playing video game Lisa: The Painful
- Brad Bellick, in the US crime drama TV series Prison Break, played by Wade Williams
- Brad Boimler, a character in the animated series Star Trek: Lower Decks
- Brad Bottig, in the US TV sitcom The Middle, played by Brock Ciarlelli
- Brad Brillnick, in the US TV sitcom It's Garry Shandling's Show, played by Bruno Kirby
- Brad Buttowski, in the US animated TV series Kick Buttowski: Suburban Daredevil, voiced by Danny Cooksey
- Brad Burns, in the fighting video game Virtua Fighter
- Brad Carbunkle, in the US animated science fiction superhero comedy TV series My Life as a Teenage Robot, voiced by Chad Doreck
- Brad Chase, in the US legal comedy drama TV series Boston Legal, played by Mark Valley
- Brad Chiles, Fred Jones' father in Scooby-Doo! Mystery Incorporated
- Brad Follmer, in the US science fiction drama TV series The X-Files, played by Cary Elwes
- Brad Gurdlinger, in the 2013 US crime comedy film We're the Millers, played by Ed Helms
- Brad Heinmuller, in the 1984 US science fiction romance film Starman, played by John Walter Davis
- Brad King, in the UK soap opera Hollyoaks, played by Tom Benedict Knight
- Brad Langford, in the US sitcom TV series Silver Spoons, played by Billy Jayne
- Brad Majors, in the musical The Rocky Horror Show, played by Christopher Malcolm (1973), Bill Miller (1974–1975), Adrian Edmondson/Craig Ferguson (1990/1991), Timothy A. Fitz-Gerald (1999), Jarrod Emick (2000), Matthew Morrison (2010), Ben Forster (2015), Richard Meek (2023), Ethan Jones (2023), and Connor Carson (2024–2026)
- Brad Park, in the action-adventure video games Dead Rising 3 (2013) and Dead Rising 4 (2016)
- Brad Snider, in the 2013 action-adventure video game Grand Theft Auto V
- Brad Snyder (As the World Turns), in the US TV soap opera As the World Turns, played by Nick Kokotakis (1998–1999), Roy Eudon (1999), John Loprieno (1999), and Austin Peck (2007–2009)
- Brad Taylor, in the US sitcom TV series Home Improvement, played by Zachery Ty Bryan
- Brad Turner, in the 1985 science fiction animated TV series M.A.S.K. (TV series), voiced by Graeme McKenna
- Brad Vickers, in the 1996 survival horror video game Resident Evil
- Brad Whitaker, in the 1987 James Bond spy film The Living Daylights, played by Joe Don Baker
- Brad White, in the 2001 US psychological horror film Frailty, played by Alan Davidson
- Brad Williams (EastEnders), in the UK TV soap opera EastEnders, played by Jonathan Stratt
- Brad Williams, in the US TV sitcom Happy Endings, played by Damon Wayans Jr.
- Brad Wilson, in the 1983 superhero film Superman III, played by Gavan O'Herlihy
- Brad Wong, in the fighting video game series Dead or Alive, portrayed by Song Lin; voiced by Grant George (English), Yukimasa Kishino (Japanese), and Unshō Ishizuka (Japanese)
