= Brad =

Brad may refer to:

- Brad (given name), a masculine given name

== Places ==
- Brad, Hunedoara, a city in Hunedoara County, Romania
- Brad, a village in Berești-Bistrița Commune, Bacău County, Romania
- Brad, a village in Filipeni, Bacău, Romania
- Brad, a village in Negri, Bacău, Romania
- Barad, Syria, also spelled "Brad", an ancient village

== Rivers ==
- Brad (Crișul Alb), a tributary of the Crișul Alb in Hunedoara County, Romania
- Brad (Suciu), a tributary of the Suciu in Maramureș County, Romania

== Other uses ==
- Brad (band), American band
- BRAD Insight, media directory
- Brad, various types of nails
- Brad, a brass fastener, a stationery item used for securing multiple sheets of paper together
- Binary radians ("brads"), a measurement of plane angle mapping one whole turn to a 2^n binary value
