= Bradley Lord =

Bradley Lord may refer to:

- Bradley Lord (figure skater), American figure skater
- Bradley Lord (motorsport), British Formula One motorsports executive
- Brad Lord, American baseball pitcher
