= St. Joseph, Louisville =

Neighborhood in Louisville, Kentucky

Coordinates: 38°13′N 85°45′W

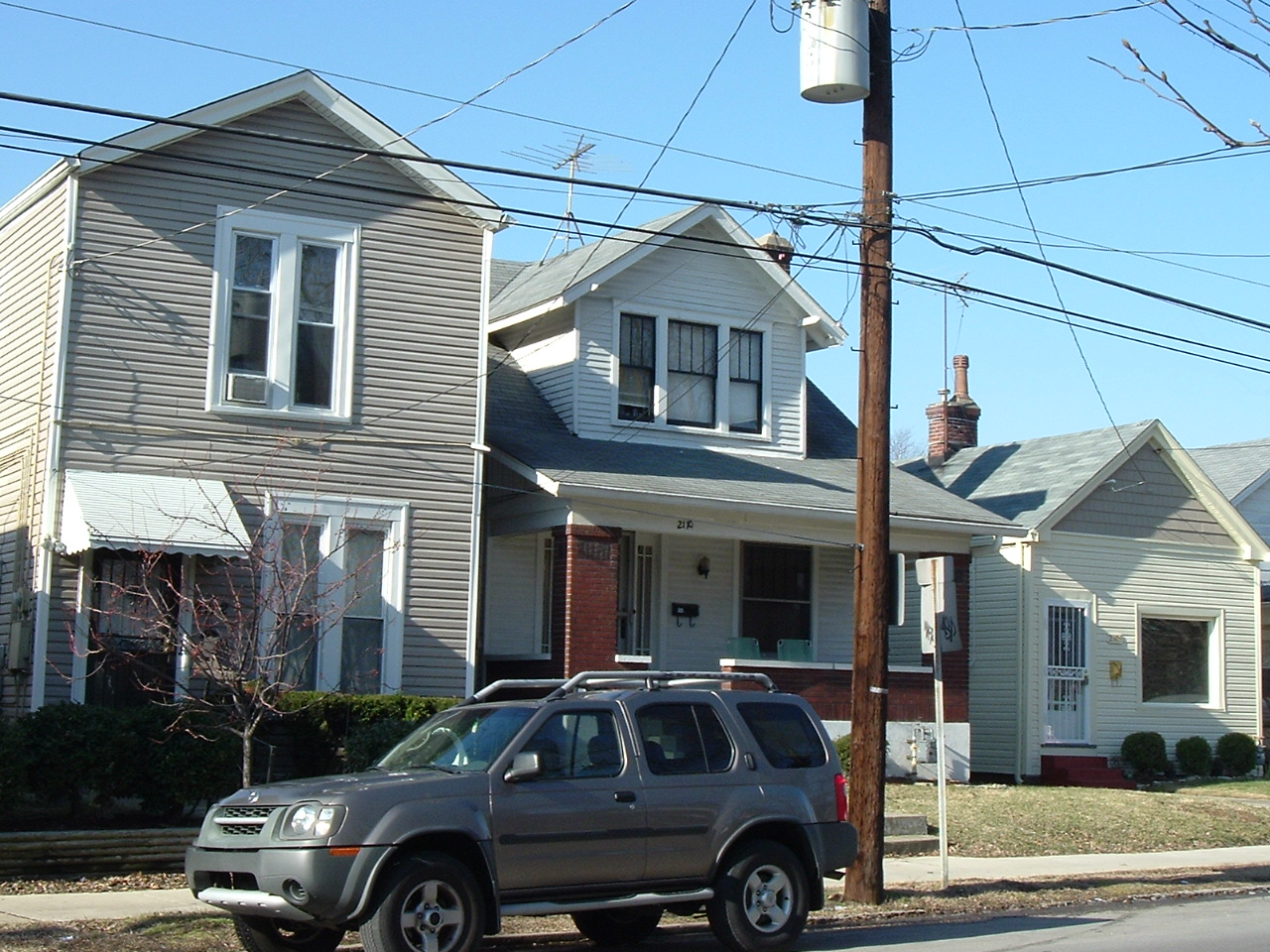
Preston Street in St. Joseph

St. Joseph is a neighborhood two miles south of downtown Louisville, Kentucky, United States, and immediately east of the University of Louisville. It borders the Meriwether neighborhood to the north and Schnitzelburg to the east. The area was named after the St. Joseph's Infirmary hospital, which was established by the Sisters of Charity of Nazareth. The hospital building, once located at the corner of Preston Street and Eastern Parkway, was razed in 1980.

The area was settled by mostly German immigrants from Bavaria in the 1900s. The housing stock is composed of bungalow and shotgun houses. The three Jewish cemeteries, Temple Cemetery, Adath Jeshuran Cemetery, and Keneseth Israel Cemetery are located next to each other in the southern part, more commonly referred to as the Bradley neighborhood.

St. Joseph's boundaries are I-65 to the west, Brandeis Ave.to the north and Shelby Street to the east.

== Demographics ==
As of 2000, the population of St. Joseph was 1,590, of which 83.6% are white, 11.4% are black, 4.8% are listed as other, and Hispanics are 0.3%. College graduates are 15.8%, people without a high school degree are 25%, people with at least one year of college without a degree are 10.9%. Females are 50.8% of the population, while males are 49.2%.

== See also ==
- History of the Germans in Louisville
