= Bradley Robinson =

Bradley Robinson may refer to:

- Bradley Robinson (cricketer) (born 1975), Zimbabwean cricketer
- Bradley Robinson (bowls) (born 1983), South African lawn bowler
- Bradley Robinson (Canadian football) (born 1985), American player of Canadian football
