= Brad Flora =

American businessperson

- Education: Princeton University (BA); Northwestern University (MA)
- Occupation: Entrepreneur
- Employer: Y Combinator
- Known for: Startups: Windy Citizen, NowSpots, Perfect Audience

Brad Flora is an American journalist, startup founder, entrepreneur, and investor. In 2006, he founded Windy Citizen, a Chicago-based news aggregator website, and in 2010, Flora began working on his advertising product, NowSpots, and developed an ad retargeting tool called Perfect Audience in 2012. In 2014, Perfect Audience was acquired by Marin Software for $25.5 million.

In 2019, Flora was brought on to Y Combinator as a Visiting Group Partner. He was promoted to a Group Partner in 2021. Since then, he has sought startups interested in developing on or augmenting stablecoin, among other funding interests.

== Early life and education ==
Flora attended Princeton University and graduated with a BA in English.

In 2006, Flora enrolled in a master's degree program at the Medill School of Journalism at Northwestern University. In 2007, as a graduate student, Flora interned for Slate.

== Career ==
=== 2006–2010: Windy Citizen ===
In October 2006, Flora founded a website called Chicago Methods Reporter—later renamed to Windy Citizen by 2008—that served as "a social approach to Chicago news and featured reader-submitted links alongside a network of original blogs" similar to Reddit or Digg. The website had resulted from Flora's project to showcase unpublished articles written by his peers in graduate school.

Flora intended for Windy Citizen to be a website for "flashmob journalism," a model in which reportage was crowdsourced to provide complete, comprehensive coverage of news. The crowdsourcing model was put to the test during Chicago's Chiditarod race during March 2008 where journalists reported on the ground alongside racing teams.

During its few years of operation, Windy Citizen was received well by journalists. Tim McGuire, a professor at the Walter Cronkite School of Journalism and Mass Communication at Arizona State University, stated: "To my old media, hidebound mind [Flora] will make some savvy investor big-time money... He knows story-telling, he knows local news and he fits in no newspaper box of which I'm aware." In May 2005, The Chicago Tribune stated that:

What the site had going for it were a savvy design, big ambitions and a healthy load of fresh content, actual reporting, writing and thinking, as opposed to just blurby press-release rewrites or regurgitation of what big media had been up to... [Flora] is pushing the envelope in terms of grabbing content from other Chicago news operations, trying to use what they do to flesh out what Windy Citizen's own contributors provide.

One year later, in 2009, Windy Citizen received $35,000 from the Knight Foundation. However, Flora noted that he wasn't making a profit nor even enough to sustain Windy Citizen's operations. In 2012, Windy Citizen was shut down, as the website started to "cost more to keep up than it's been generating revenue-wise," and Flora wanted to fully focus on NowSpots. Flora also mentioned other issues, including the proliferation of spammers and performance issues prior to its closure, as well as tough competition from other news aggregator sites and social media platforms.

=== 2010–2016: NowSpots and Perfect Audience ===
While running Windy Citizen, Flora began developing NowSpots, a "real-time, social-media-fueled local ads" experiment that collated and presented advertisements from local businesses on Facebook, Twitter, and Flickr. In 2010, NowSpots won $250,000 from the Knight Foundation's Knight News Challenge to augment NowSpots. Flora also began to seek more funding from investors.

In 2011, Flora was accepted into Y Combinator, raised $1 million in seed funding, and moved to the San Francisco Bay Area to continue developing NowSpots. In 2012, he collaborated with a developer named Jordan Buller to nurture NowSpots into a fully fledged software company. By May, NowSpots was included in a Chicago forum hosted by the Knight Foundation and the Paley Center for Media called "The Next Big Thing in Digital News Innovation."

However, Flora and Buller were having trouble selling and scaling NowSpots. After thinking more about the advertising market, they refocused their efforts on ad retargeting. In October, NowSpots retooled into Perfect Audience, "a retargeting tool that uses cookies to track visitors, then serve them customers' banner ads on Facebook and other sites in the Perfect Audience Network." The service intended to "give [customers] the nudge that makes them buy" while also allowing "complementary businesses" to advertise to each other's customers.

One year later, in June 2014, Marin Software bought Perfect Audience for $25.5 million. By then, Perfect Audience had 14 employees working in San Francisco, Chicago, and Raleigh, and the company had been backed by investors in Y Combinator, the Knight Foundation, New World Ventures, WGI Group, Start Fund, and SV Angel, among others. After the acquisition, Flora was assigned to lead "a new display and programmatic advertising team" at Marin Software.

Of the acquisitions process, Flora wrote in Slate that it "took six months of writing carefully worded emails, meeting secretly in cafés, and pacing around the streets of San Francisco's SoMa neighborhood after dark." He then discussed his experiences demoing Perfect Audience for Marin Software and proceeding through several months of acquisition talk: "a blur of negotiations, heated exchanges, asks, counters, and conferring with investors... It turns out closing is actually really hard to do." Post-acquisition, Flora worked at Marin Software for two years before leaving in 2016.
