= Bradley Anholt =

Canadian ecologist

Bradley Anholt is a Canadian ecologist, currently professor emeritus in the Department of Biology at the University of Victoria in Canada after an impactful career in experimental and applied ecology. His research mainly revolves around how biodiversity is maintained in ecosystems. The main topics of his research includes prey-predator relationships, temperature-dependence of sex determination, and biological invasions.

He was an influential figure in ecological research, serving both as the Director of the Bamfield Marine Research Center, a marine research center ran by the University of Victoria, and the Canada Research Chair for Experimental and Applied Ecology.

== Early life ==
=== Education ===
He received his Bachelors of Science from the University of Alberta in 1979. He received his Masters in Biological Sciences from the University of Calgary in Canada. He received his PhD in Zoology from the University of British Columbia in 1998. His thesis defense explored the various factors that affect coenagrionid damselflies' larval survival, growth, and reproduction success. This paper lays the ground for his future research papers, rooted in experimental ecology.

After receiving his PhD, Anholt pursued the Killam and Natural Sciences and Engineering Research Council postdoctoral fellowships at the University of Michigan and Queen’s University. His research has led to 42 papers, international recognition, and a UVic Faculty of Science Excellence in Research Award.

== Career and research ==
He joined the University of Victoria in 1996 from a position at the University of Zurich. In 2008, he was named the director of the Bamfield Marine Sciences Centre. He continued to serve as the director of the Bamfield Marine Sciences Centre until 2018. He was recognized in the newsletter by the Department of Biology at the University of Victoria for his "strong financial management, great success in obtaining equipment and infrastructure grants, diversification of course offerings, building a positive relationship with the Huu-ay-aht First Nation, attracting new researchers and reinvigorating school programs."

While serving as the Director of the Bamfield Marine Sciences Centre, he was also the Principal Investigator for the Anholt Lab. His research lab studied how the evolution of sex ratio varies in the model organism,Tigriopus californicus. This organism was chosen for the study because they are easily reared in the laboratory since they are adapted to a constantly fluctuating environment and have a short generation cycle. Anholt mentored numerous students at the University of Victoria in his lab, including both undergraduate and graduate students.

In addition to his research projects at the University of Victoria, he was also appointed to the Canada Research Chair for Experimental and Applied Ecology. Chairholders work in multiple disciplines, including natural science, engineering, health sciences, humanities, and social sciences. They strengthen Canada's research domain and help train the next generation's talent.
