= Brady Smith =

Brady Smith may refer to:

- Brady Smith (actor) (born 1971), American actor and artist
- Brady Smith (American football) (born 1973), American football player
- Brady Smith (soccer) (born 1989), Australian soccer player

== See also ==
- Brad Smith (disambiguation)
