= Bradleys =

Bradleys may refer to:

- Bradleys (fur retailers), British retailer established in 1860s
- Bradlees, American discount chain
- Bradleys Both, North Yorkshire, England

== See also ==
- Bradley (disambiguation)
