= BRAD Insight =

BRAD Insight is a provider of information on the media and marketing industry in the United Kingdom. The product is managed by Mediatel Ltd. (an Adwanted Group company) who are based at Strand, London.

BRAD Insight logo

== History ==
The firm's launch in 1954 was fuelled by the post-war revolution in the UK consumer magazine and newspaper markets. The British Rate And Data directory (known as BRAD) was first published in print and initially contained the details of around 2000 print media that were then accepting advertising. The final print copy of BRAD was published in March 2009. BRAD is now available online via subscription services known as BRAD connect & BRAD intelligence. BRAD currently contains more than 14,000 detailed media entries across seven media channels (Business Press, Consumer Press, Newspapers, TV, Radio, Out of Home and Digital).

In February 1987, Black Box Publishing launched the Account List File (known as ALF), a printed directory providing information about relationships between the UK's top spending advertisers, the brands they own and the advertising agencies they work with (including details of key personnel making advertising decisions on behalf of the brands). BBP was eventually bought by Data Management Services moving to offices in Ramillies Street in central London. At the time the data was sold through print and a software based CRM system. Eventually DMS was bought by Pearson and the ALF range was stabled with The Register and Magazine Business as Register Information Services, with offices in London near The Angel. The company was acquired by Emap in 1999 and ALF and BRAD were brought together. Following 276 editions, 267,145 pages and a total of 3.8 million updates, the final printed edition of ALF was released in August 2010. The ALF directory is now available online via subscription services known as ALF Connect and ALF Intelligence.

BRAD and ALF are both acronyms, standing for British Rate and Data and Account List File respectively. BRAD Insight was known as The Brad Group until it was re-launched in 2007 by Emap.

== Current operations ==
New modular versions of ALF Intelligence based on key market factors have been added to the ALF Business Development portfolio. The latest, focusing on brands in the fast-moving consumer goods (FMCG) market, was released in July 2011.

Brad Insight continues to partner with the Guardian Media Group plc on various events, including the MEGAs and the Changing Media Summit. and also sponsors several other media events, such as the Media Festival and the FRESH Awards.
