= Bradley (CDP), Maine =

Bradley, Maine
- Census-designated place
- Location within Maine Location within the United States
- Coordinates: 44°54′38″N 68°37′39″W
- Country: United States
- State: Maine
- County: Penobscot
- Town: Bradley

Area
  - Total: 2.11 sq mi (5.47 km^{2})
  - Land: 2.03 sq mi (5.27 km^{2})
  - Water: 0.077 sq mi (0.20 km^{2})
- Elevation: 95 ft (29 m)

Population (2020)
  - Total: 765
  - Density: 376.1/sq mi (145.23/km^{2})
- Time zone: UTC-5 (Eastern (EST))
  - Summer (DST): UTC-4 (EDT)
- ZIP Code: 04411
- Area code: 207
- FIPS code: 23-06645
- GNIS feature ID: 2806284

Bradley is a census-designated place (CDP) and the primary village in the town of Bradley, Penobscot County, Maine, United States. It is in the northwest corner of the town, bordered to the north by the town of Milford and to the west by the Penobscot River. Across the river is the city of Old Town to the northwest and the town of Orono to the west.

Bradley was first listed as a CDP prior to the 2020 census.

== Demographics ==
Historical population
Census	Pop.	Note	%±
2020	765		—
U.S. Decennial Census
