= Bradley Ogden =

American chef

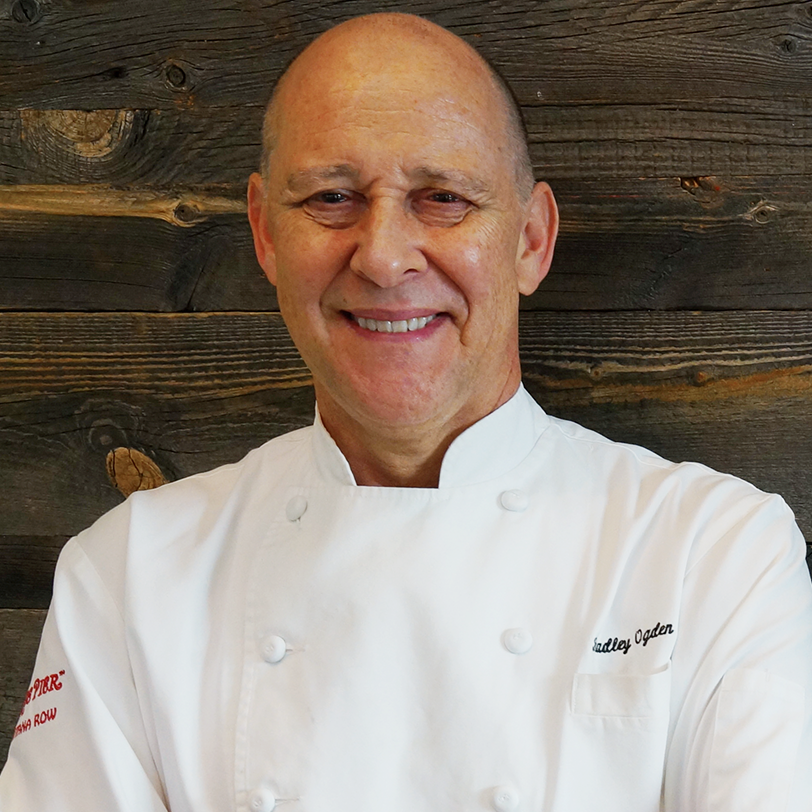
- Born: Bradley Ogden; Traverse City, Michigan
- Education: Culinary Institute of America at Hyde Park, New York
- Website: http://ogdenhospitality.com/

Bradley Ogden is an American chef who manages Bradley Ogden Hospitality.

== Early career ==
Ogden graduated from the Culinary Institute of America at Hyde Park, New York in 1977 with honors. He was the recipient of the Richard T. Keating Award. In 1979, Ogden was hired as a sous chef at the American Restaurant in Kansas City. He worked closely with his friend and mentor James Beard and his consultants Joe Baum and Barbara Kafka, and was promoted to executive chef within six months. Ogden says the greatest influence on his cooking came from his early exposure to fresh Native American foods.

In 1983, Ogden was the first executive chef at the Campton Place restaurant in San Francisco. In 1989, he founded the Lark Creek Inn, in Larkspur, California.

== Career ==
In 2003, Ogden moved to Las Vegas and opened his restaurant in Caesars Palace with his son Bryan, who is also a chef. This was Ogden's first restaurant that opened outside of California. Both restaurants have since closed.

Chef Bradley Ogden served as managing partner of Bradley Ogden Hospitality which he founded with his son, Chef Bryan Ogden. The group consists of multiple areas of focus including media, restaurant development, new products and more. Ogden Hospitality opened four restaurants in 2015 including: The Pour Society and Bradley's Fine Diner in Houston, Texas, as well as Bradley's Fine Diner, and Bradley's Funky Franks in Menlo Park, California. All have since closed.

As of 2023, Chef Ogden was brought on as Culinary Director at Marché Bacchus, a French-inspired Restaurant in Las Vegas, Nevada. He is bringing his farm-to-table style to the restaurant and is assembling a team of Chefs to help bring his vision to life.

== Criminal history ==
In 2008, Ogden was convicted of misdemeanor battery in Las Vegas, Nevada and sentenced to 180 days in jail. The offense was a 2006 attack on his then-girlfriend, in which he grabbed and pushed her to the floor, and came after previous run-ins with police over violence with the same victim.

== Personal life ==
Ogden as of May 2023 resides in Las Vegas. He has three sons; Bryan, Chad (also a chef at a Macau resort) and Cory who is a doctor in Woodland Hills, California.

== Publications ==
Ogden's first cookbook Bradley Ogden's Breakfast, Lunch & Dinner won the International Association of Culinary Professionals Award.

1. Bradley Ogden's Breakfast, Lunch & Dinner (1991)
2. Holiday Dinners with Bradley Ogden. (2011)
