= Bradley S. Greenberg =

American communications theorist

Bradley Sanders Greenberg (1934 – 26 July 2018) was an American communications theorist.

Greenberg studied journalism at Bowling Green State University, then earned a master's degree in the subject from the University of Wisconsin. He remained at UW to complete doctorate in mass communications, after which Greenberg became a research associate at the Institute for Communication Research of Stanford University. Greenberg joined the Michigan State University faculty in 1964. He was appointed a MSU Distinguished Professor in 1990. Greenberg, a fellow of the International Communication Association since 1983, served as its president from 1994 to 1995. He retired from Michigan State in 2004. Greenberg was a co-founding editor of the journal Media and Communication, first published in 2013.

Greenberg lived in Okemos, Michigan, and died at the age of 83 on 26 July 2018, of cancer.
