= Bamfield Marine Sciences Centre =

Marine research centre in Canada

Coordinates: 48.835262°N 125.135500°W

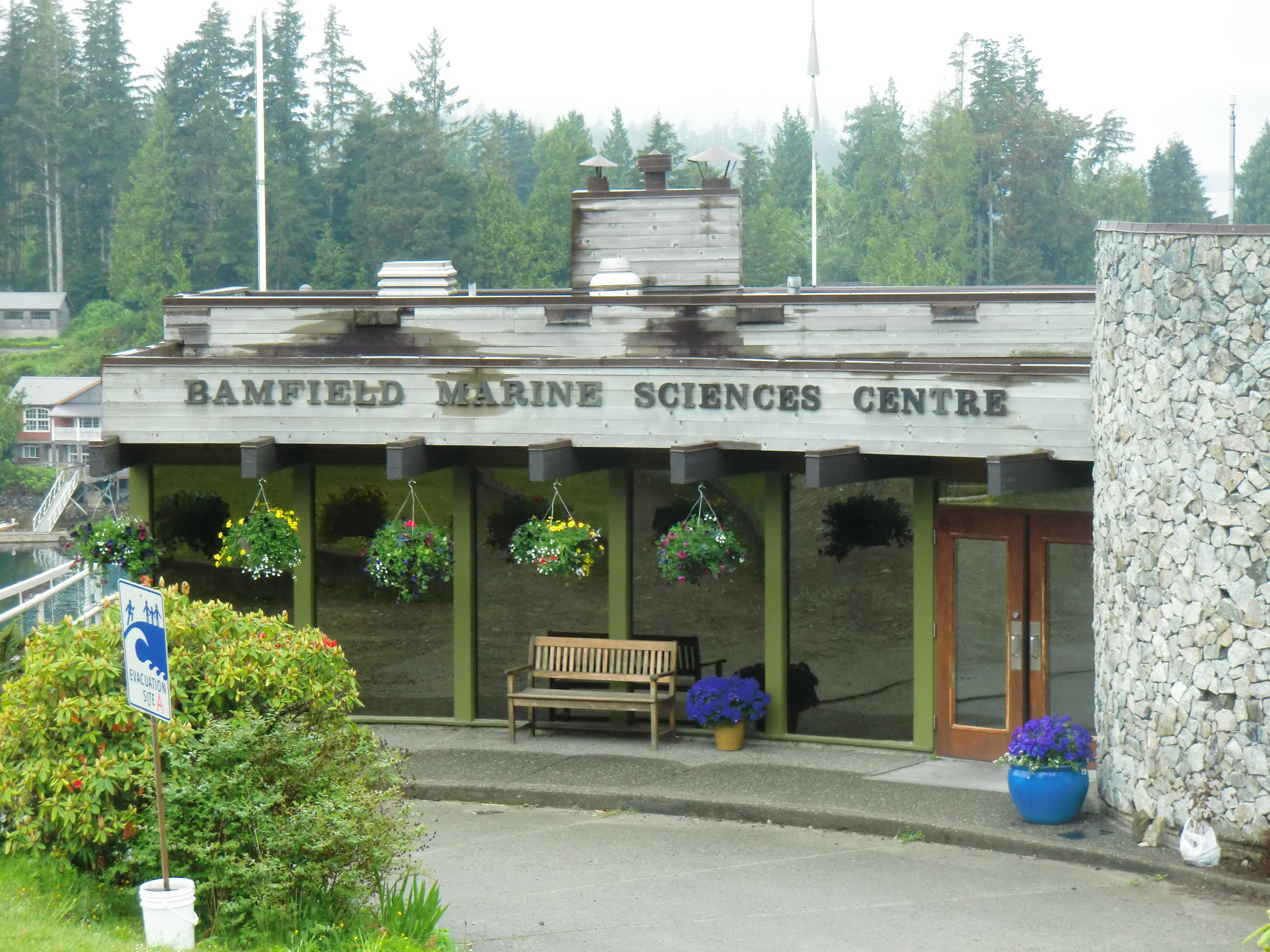
The main building of the Bamfield Marine Sciences Centre, and one of the original cable station buildings.

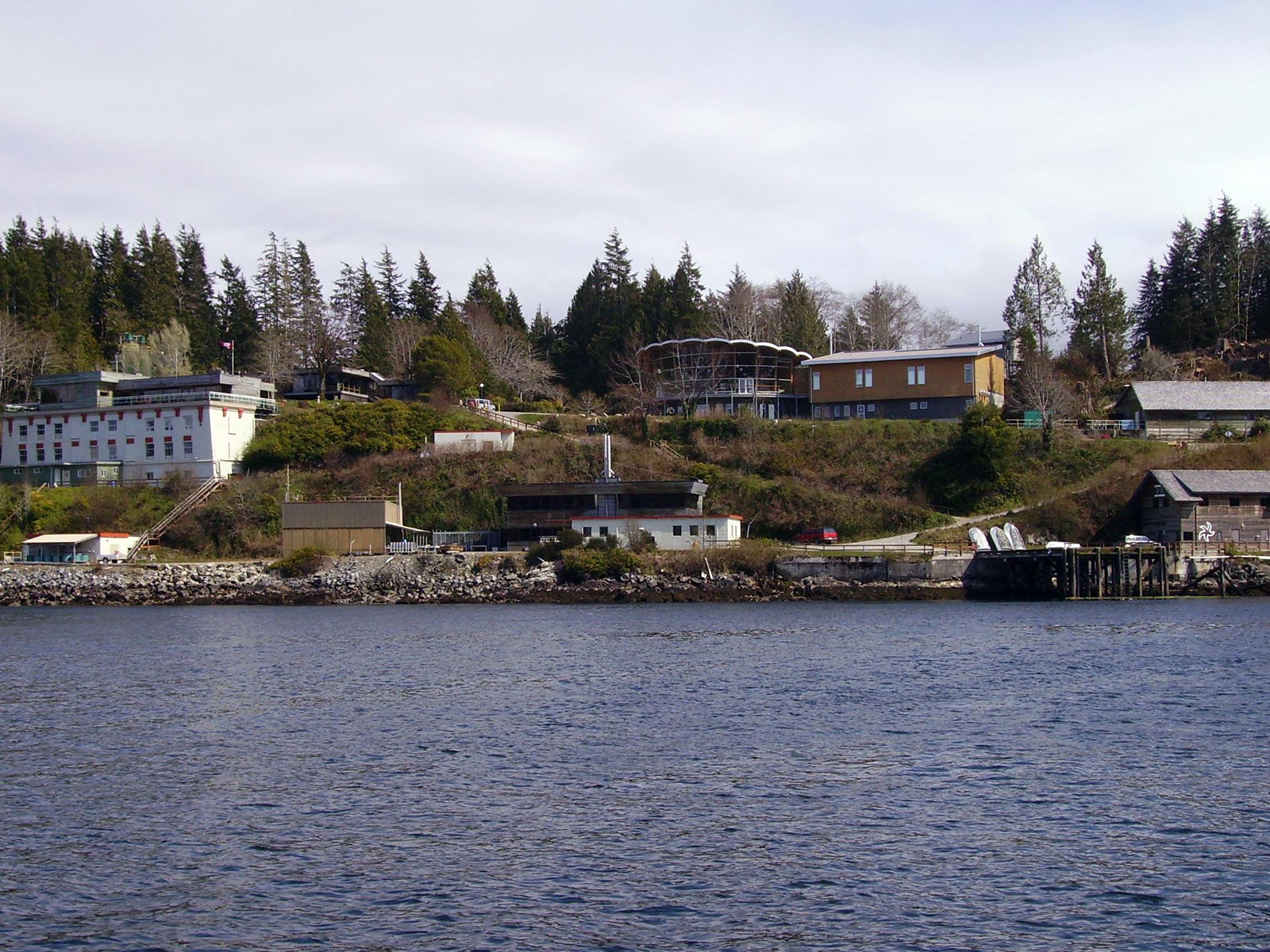
Clockwise from top left: main building, whale lab, cafeteria, Rix Centre for Ocean Discoveries, boat shed, COTC lab, ecophysiology lab, cable tank, pump station

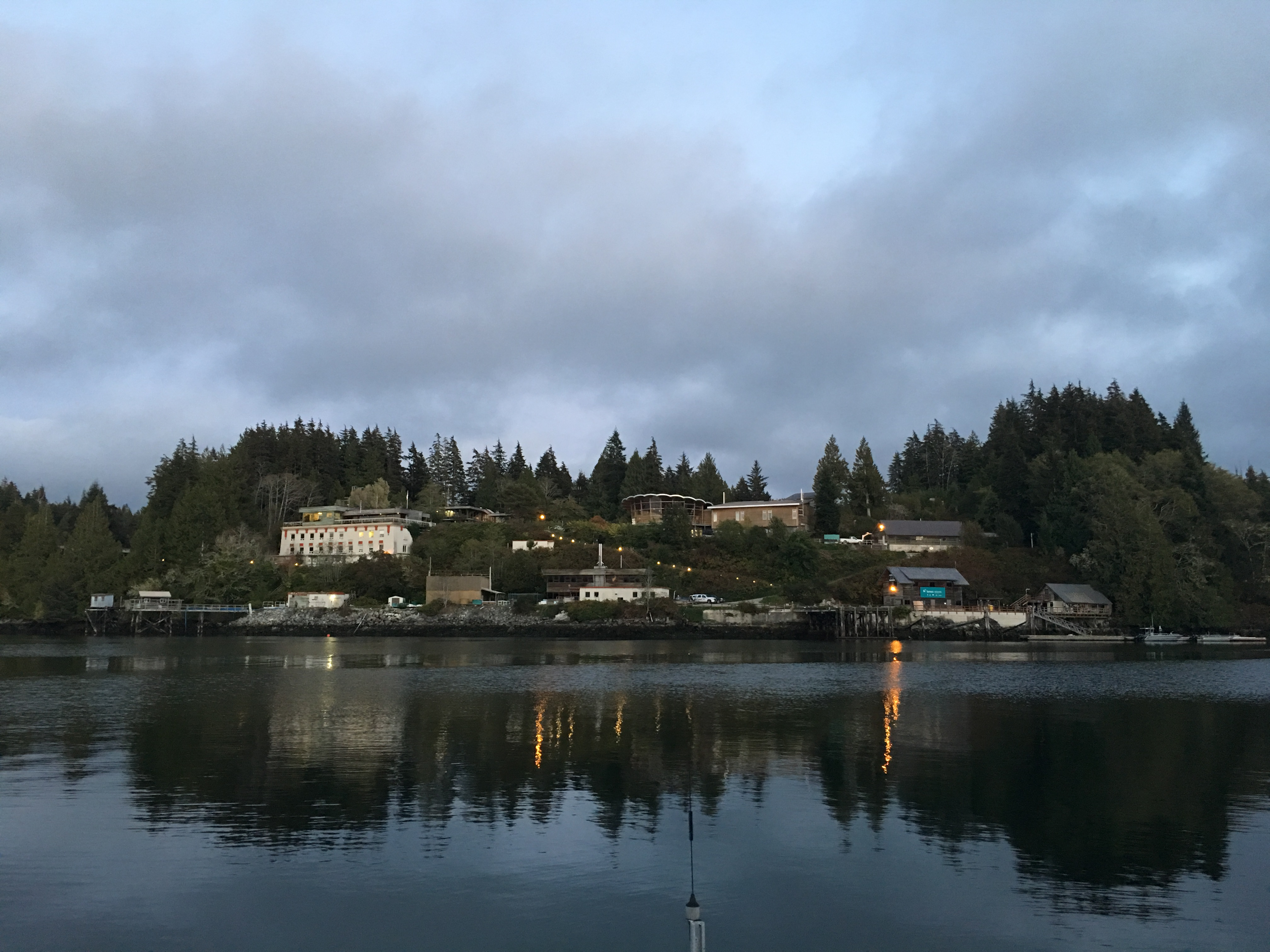
A wider view of Bamfield Marine Sciences Centre from the opposite side of the inlet.

Bamfield Marine Sciences Centre (formerly the Bamfield Marine Station) is a marine research station established in 1972, located in Bamfield, Barkley Sound, British Columbia and run by the University of Victoria, the University of British Columbia, Simon Fraser University, the University of Alberta, and the University of Calgary. The centre hosts numerous public education programs in marine related science. BC Field Trips organizes many instructional and educational programs for school-aged children at the centre. The centre also runs courses for university students during the summer (May to late August or early September) and during the fall (September to mid-December) through their affiliated universities.

The centre is housed in the original building used as the western terminus of the British Empire's worldwide undersea cable called the All Red Line. Originally the site of the Pacific Cable Board (PCB) Cable Station, which served as the eastern terminus of the trans-Pacific telegraph cable linking Canada to Fanning Island (1,600 kilometres south of Hawaii). The telegraph cable operated from 1901 to 1959.

From 1969 to 1980, the Bamfield Marine Station was part of the British Columbia Shore Station Oceanographic Program, collecting coastal water temperature and salinity measurements for the Department of Fisheries and Oceans everyday for 11 years.

The centre also lends continued logistical support for Folger Passage and Barkley Sound with Ocean Networks Canada.

In April 2016, Bamfield Marine Sciences Centre and the Huu-ay-aht First Nations partnered with the Hakai Institute to launch a drone. The drone took a series of photos, which were then used to map portions of the Barkley Sound area.

On July 1, 2018, Dr. Sean Rogers, a biology instructor at the University of Calgary, was named director of the Bamfield Marine Sciences Centre for a five-year term. Rogers has taught university courses at the centre, and had been named acting director in 2016.
