= Bradley Brookshire =

American musician

Bradley Brookshire (born 1959) is an American-born harpsichordist.

He earned his undergraduate degree from the University of Michigan School of Music (in Music History and Musicology), his Master of Music from Mannes College in New York City (Historical Performance and Conducting), and is a Candidate for the Ph.D. in Musicology at the Graduate Center of the City University of New York, where he is also pursuing a diploma in Interactive Technology and Pedagogy. His harpsichord studies were with Edward Parmentier, Andreas Staier, and Arthur Haas.

In 1997, Brookshire began a traversal of the complete harpsichord works of Bach in a series of eight recitals in various concert halls in New York City.

He has recorded Purcell, Handel, and Bach. In The New York Times, James Oestreich cited his 2001 recording of Bach's French Suites in his Critic's Choice roundup of the best classical recordings of that year. He is included on two tracks of Robert Hill's recording of the early version of Bach's Art of the Fugue, and released his own recording of that work in 2007. It includes a second disc with which one may view the score of the work while listening to MP3 recordings of his performance.
