= Bradley (automobile) =

Defunct American motor vehicle manufacturer

The Bradley was an automobile manufactured in Cicero, Illinois, United States, by the Bradley Motor Car Company. Production commenced in 1920 with the Model H tourer, which was powered by a 4 cylinder Lycoming engine, had a 116-inch wheelbase, and a selling price of $1295.

In 1921 the Model H continued in production, but was joined by the 6 cylinder powered Model F, also available as a tourer for $1500.

In November 1920, the company went into involuntary receivership, with liabilities of approximately $100,000. Although the assets held by the company were greater, including finished and partly-assembled vehicles, along with a large inventory, the company was bankrupt by the end of 1921. Total production of the Bradley automobile was 263 cars.
