= Bradley, Maine =

Town in Maine, United States

- Town
- Seal

- Location within Maine Location within the United States
- Coordinates: 44°53′05″N 68°35′52″W
- Country: United States
- State: Maine
- County: Penobscot

Area
  - Total: 50.65 sq mi (131.18 km^{2})
  - Land: 49.52 sq mi (128.26 km^{2})
  - Water: 1.13 sq mi (2.93 km^{2})
- Elevation: 144 ft (44 m)

Population (2020)
  - Total: 1,532
  - Density: 31/sq mi (11.9/km^{2})
- Time zone: UTC-5 (Eastern (EST))
  - Summer (DST): UTC-4 (EDT)
- ZIP code: 04411
- Area code: 207
- FIPS code: 23-06680
- GNIS feature ID: 582364
- Website: townofbradley.net

Bradley is a town in Penobscot County, Maine, United States. It is part of the Bangor Metropolitan Statistical Area. The population was 1,532 at the 2020 census. The village of Bradley is in the northwestern corner of the town.

== History ==
Bradley was incorporated as a town in 1834, with lumbering and sawmilling as the principal industries. It was named for Bradley Blackman, an early settler. By the 1850s the town had 14 single-saw mills, three gang-saw (multiple-saw) mills, four clapboard mills, four lath mills, and three shingle mills. The only village was at Greatworks. The Maine Forest & Logging Museum, located at Leonard's Mills, was established in 1960 to preserve the logging history of Maine.

== Geography ==
According to the United States Census Bureau, the town has a total area of 50.65 square miles (131.18 km^{2}), of which 49.52 square miles (128.26 km^{2}) is land and 1.13 square miles (2.93 km^{2}) is water.

== Demographics ==
Historical population
Census	Pop.	Note	%±
1840	395		—
1850	796		101.5%
1860	844		6.0%
1870	866		2.6%
1880	829		−4.3%
1890	823		−0.7%
1900	682		−17.1%
1910	634		−7.0%
1920	672		6.0%
1930	671		−0.1%
1940	716		6.7%
1950	786		9.8%
1960	951		21.0%
1970	1,010		6.2%
1980	1,149		13.8%
1990	1,136		−1.1%
2000	1,242		9.3%
2010	1,492		20.1%
2020	1,532		2.7%
U.S. Decennial Census

=== 2010 census ===
At the 2010 census there were 1,492 people, 625 households, and 411 families living in the town. The population density was 30.1 inhabitants per square mile (11.6/km^{2}). There were 719 housing units at an average density of 14.5 per square mile (5.6/km^{2}). The racial makeup of the town was 97.3% White, 0.1% African American, 1.5% Native American, 0.3% Asian, 0.1% from other races, and 0.7% from two or more races. Hispanic or Latino of any race were 0.3%.

Of the 625 households 30.6% had children under the age of 18 living with them, 49.9% were married couples living together, 10.9% had a female householder with no husband present, 5.0% had a male householder with no wife present, and 34.2% were non-families. 25.1% of households were one person and 9.5% were one person aged 65 or older. The average household size was 2.39 and the average family size was 2.82.

The median age in the town was 40 years. 21.9% of residents were under the age of 18; 8.2% were between the ages of 18 and 24; 26.8% were from 25 to 44; 28.3% were from 45 to 64; and 14.7% were 65 or older. The gender makeup of the town was 48.9% male and 51.1% female.

=== 2000 census ===
At the 2000 census there were 1,242 people, 514 households, and 363 families living in the town. The population density was 25.1 people per square mile (9.7/km^{2}). There were 614 housing units at an average density of 12.4 per square mile (4.8/km^{2}). The racial makeup of the town was 98.47% White, 0.16% African American, 0.40% Native American, 0.08% Asian, 0.08% Pacific Islander, 0.40% from other races, and 0.40% from two or more races. Hispanic or Latino of any race were 0.64%.

Of the 514 households 30.9% had children under the age of 18 living with them, 59.5% were married couples living together, 6.6% had a female householder with no husband present, and 29.2% were non-families. 22.0% of households were one person and 7.2% were one person aged 65 or older. The average household size was 2.42 and the average family size was 2.81.

The age distribution was 21.9% under the age of 18, 7.6% from 18 to 24, 32.6% from 25 to 44, 23.6% from 45 to 64, and 14.3% 65 or older. The median age was 39 years. For every 100 females, there were 96.8 males. For every 100 females age 18 and over, there were 94.8 males.

The median household income was $37,163 and the median family income was $41,417. Males had a median income of $30,647 versus $21,359 for females. The per capita income for the town was $18,009. About 5.8% of families and 9.3% of the population were below the poverty line, including 11.4% of those under age 18 and 7.9% of those age 65 or over.
