= Bradley Cantrell =

American architect (born 1975)

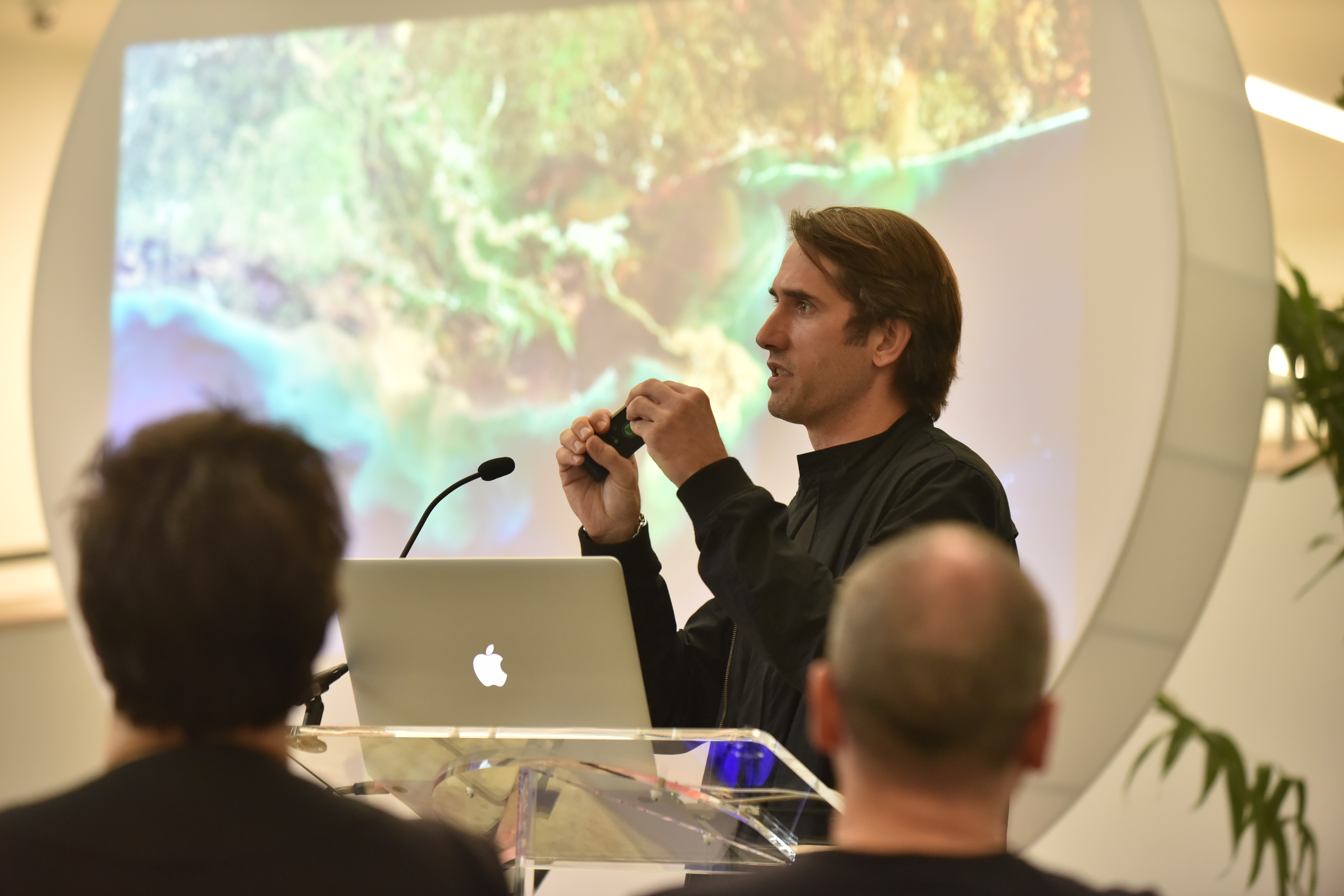
Bradley Cantrell
- Born: March 26, 1975 (age 51); Seoul, South Korea
- Education: Harvard Graduate School of Design 2003
- Occupation: Architect
- Awards: Rome Prize, TED Fellow, ASLA Award of Excellence, CELA

Bradley Cantrell (born 1975) is a landscape architect and academic researching computation in landscape architecture.

Bradley Cantrell stands as a significant figure in contemporary landscape architecture, distinguished by his pioneering efforts to integrate computational methodologies, responsive technologies, and ecological principles into the design, understanding, and experience of landscapes, particularly at the territorial scale. His career reflects a dedicated pursuit of bridging the gap between established landscape practices and the nascent digital technologies transforming the discipline. Cantrell's work is characterized by a commitment to moving beyond purely theoretical explorations, grounding his research in practical applications that seek to redefine the capabilities of landscape architecture in addressing complex environmental challenges through the development of adaptive, resilient, and responsive systems.

His contributions mark a critical engagement with the evolving nature of the field. The trajectory of Cantrell's research and publications mirrors, and indeed actively shapes, what might be termed the "computational turn" within landscape architecture. His intellectual journey, evident in his published works, progresses from leveraging digital tools for representation towards employing simulation and interactive systems for environmental modeling and engagement, culminating in explorations of computational processes themselves, including concepts like autonomy and artificial intelligence within ecological contexts. This progression signifies a shift from using computation for landscape architecture to thinking computationally about landscape architecture, fundamentally influencing how the discipline conceives of and interacts with environmental systems. His work consistently foregrounds how computation can be utilized not merely for efficiency or visualization, but as a means to "express and engage the complexity of overlapping physical, cultural, and economic systems" inherent in landscapes.

== Biography ==
Bradley Cantrell was born in Seoul, Korea to Reynolds and Lynda Cantrell. He grew up outside of the United States, with his childhood in Okinawa, Japan and Bitburg, Germany.

Bradley Cantrell received his undergraduate education from the University of Kentucky and a Masters in Landscape Architecture from the Harvard Graduate School of Design, where he focused on media and responsive technologies. After completing his studies at Harvard he worked professionally and maintained academic appointments at the Harvard Graduate School of Design, Rhode Island School of Design, Louisiana State University. During his time at Louisiana State University he developed courses in digital media and design studios that tested how responsive technologies and robotics might help shape future large scale infrastructure. This work was primarily situated in the Mississippi River Delta and addressed issues of land and habitat loss. His current work at the Harvard Graduate School of Design advances this research and continues to develop new methods of real time sensing, response, and autonomous infrastructures.

Cantrell's contribution to landscape architecture education is significant, after being granted tenure in 2012 at Louisiana State University he has held significant administrative appointments as graduate program director at the Harvard Graduate School of Design and currently is the acting Chair of Landscape Architecture at the University of Virginia School of Architecture. His approach to the discipline attempts to develop an education that merges socio-cultural and techno-centric approaches to territorial and planetary scale landscape issues. The curriculum and faculty in the UVA Department of Landscape Architecture clearly represents this vision and have created a cohort of researchers and educators that are focusing on issues of social and environmental justice, changing climate, and technological innovation via applied projects and theoretical approaches.

== Honors and awards ==
In 2012 he received the American Society of Landscape Architects award of excellence in communication for his book Digital Drawing for Landscape Architecture, co authored with Kenneth Wes Michaels. He was bestowed with the Rome Prize in Landscape Architecture in 2013 from the American Academy in Rome. In 2014, he was named a TED Global Fellow.

== Publications ==
1. Digital Drawing for Landscape Architecture, Bradley Cantrell and Wes Michaels (Wiley, 2010)
2. Modeling the Environment, Bradley Cantrell and Natalie Yates (Wiley, 2012)
3. Responsive Landscapes, Bradley Cantrell and Justine Holzman (Routledge, 2015)
4. Codify, Bradley Cantrell and Adam Mekies (Routledge, 2018)
