= Brad Hawkins (disambiguation) =

Brad Hawkins (born 1974) is an American actor and singer.

Brad Hawkins may also refer to:

- Brad Hawkins (American football) (born 1998), American football player
- Brad Hawkins (politician) (born 1975), American politician
