= Bradley Fields =

American magician (1951–2020)

Bradley Fields (July 24, 1951 – May 5, 2020) was an American magician known for performing traditional vaudeville-style illusions.

== Biography ==
Born in 1951 in Spring Valley, New York as Bradley Feldstein. He was the eldest of three children of Robert Fields, a registered nurse, singer, and actor, and a mother who was a psychologist. He earned a Bachelor of Arts in philosophy in 1973 from the State University of New York at Purchase. He later studied acting and directing at the Stella Adler Studio in New York, as well as mime under Étienne Decroux in Paris.

Fields began his career at Greenwich Village folk clubs as a performer, where he opened for musicians such as Dion and Tim Hardin. Following a year teaching elementary school in Chinatown, Manhattan, he developed "MatheMagic," a children's show that he performed up to 200 times annually.
