= Bradley Ross =

Australian rules footballer

Personal information
- Full name: Bradley Ross
- Born: 2 May 1963
- Died: 22 January 1990 (aged 26)
- Original team: East Burwood
- Height: 178 cm (5 ft 10 in)
- Weight: 76 kg (168 lb)

Playing career^{1}
| Years | Club | Games (Goals) |
| 1983 | Richmond | 1 (0) |
- ^{1} Playing statistics correct to the end of 1983.

Bradley Ross (2 May 1963 – 22 January 1990) was an Australian rules footballer who played with Richmond in the Victorian Football League (VFL).
