= Bradley G. Pieper =

American businessman and politician

Bradley G. Pieper (born June 16, 1942) is an American businessman and politician.

Pieper was born in Minneapolis, Minnesota and went to the Minneapolis public schools and to the University of Minnesota. He lived in Burnsville, Minnesota with his wife and family and was the owner of an exterminating business. Pieper served in the Minnesota House of Representatives in 1973 and 1974 and was a Republican.
