= Justice Bradley =

Justice Bradley may refer to:

- Ann Walsh Bradley (born 1950), associate justice of the Wisconsin Supreme Court
- Charles S. Bradley (1819–1888), chief justice of the Rhode Island Supreme Court
- James Bradley (judge) (1810–1887), associate justice of the Nebraska Supreme Court
- Joseph P. Bradley (1813–1892), associate justice of the Supreme Court of the United States (1870-1892)
- Rebecca Bradley (born 1971), associate justice of the Wisconsin Supreme Court
- Stephen R. Bradley (1754–1830), associate justice of the Vermont Supreme Court
