= Bradley Peterson =

American psychiatrist, developmental neuroscientist

Bradley S. Peterson
- Occupations: Adult and child psychiatrist, developmental neuroscientist, academic and author

Academic background
- Education: B.S., Philosophy; M.D.
- Alma mater: Tulane University; St. Catherine's College, Oxford University; University of Wisconsin–Madison Medical School; Harvard University; Yale University

Academic work
- Institutions: Yale University; Columbia University; University of Southern California

Bradley S. Peterson is an American psychiatrist, developmental neuroscientist, academic and author. He is the Inaugural Director of the Institute for the Developing Mind at Children's Hospital Los Angeles (CHLA), and holds the positions of Vice Chair for Research and Chief of the Division of Child & Adolescent Psychiatry in the Department of Psychiatry at the Keck School of Medicine at the University of Southern California.

Peterson is most known for his neuroscience research on neuropsychiatric disorders including autism, depression, bipolar disorder, ADHD, Tourette syndrome, obsessive-compulsive disorder, schizophrenia, and eating disorders, as well as premature birth, the effects of environmental toxins on brain development, and brain mechanisms that mediate the effects of treatments on clinical outcomes. He has also studied normal brain development, and brain processes that support normal cognitive and emotional processes.

Peterson was named Outstanding Mentor by the American Academy of Child and Adolescent Psychiatry in 2006 and 2014, and he is the recipient of the 2007 Columbia University John J. Weber Prize for Outstanding Research, the 2012 American Psychiatric Association Blanche Ittleson Award, the 2024 Leadership in Child, Adolescent and Young Adult Psychiatry from the American College of Psychiatrists, the 2012 Excellence in Teaching Award from the New York Presbyterian Hospital of Columbia and Cornell Universities, and the 2017 and 2020 USC Keck School of Medicine Dean's Teaching Award.

Peterson is a Fellow of the American College of Neuropsychopharmacology and the American College of Psychiatrists. He is the Editor for the Neuroscience Section of the Journal of Child Psychology & Psychiatry.

== Education and early career ==
Peterson graduated with a bachelor's degree in philosophy from Tulane University in 1983 and an M.D. from the University of Wisconsin–Madison Medical School in 1987 and also studied philosophy at St. Catherine's College of Oxford University.

== Career ==
Peterson began his academic career at the Yale School of Medicine as an Assistant Professor in Child Psychiatry in 1994, the Elizabeth Meers and House Jameson Assistant/Associate Professor in 1996 and associate professor in 2000. In 2001, he became an Associate Professor in Child Psychiatry at the Columbia College of Physicians & Surgeons from 2001 to 2014 and a professor in psychiatry from 2005 to 2014. Subsequently, he joined the University of Southern California as a professor in the Department of Psychiatry in 2014.

Since 2017, he has been the Director of Child & Adolescent Psychiatry since 2014 and the Vice Chair for Research in the Department of Psychiatry of the Keck School of Medicine at the University of Southern California. He has been the Director of the Institute for the Developing Mind at Children's Hospital Los Angeles since 2014, where he has also served as Interim Chief Scientific Officer from 2016 to 2018, Chief of Psychiatry since 2019, and co-director of the Behavioral Health Institute since 2022.

== Research ==
Peterson has studied normal brain development across the life span, normal and pathological impulse control, prenatal exposures, emotional processing and mood disorders, autism spectrum disorders, and the development of new MRI methods.

=== Normal brain development ===
Peterson has investigated normal brain development, normal aging, normal cognitive and emotional processes, and self-regulatory control. He and his colleagues demonstrated that gray matter density declines nonlinearly with age in frontal and parietal cortices from early childhood to approximately age 40, and declining in the left posterior temporal region beginning approximately at age 60, indicating that cortical maturation and aging trajectories vary across the brain. In addition, he showed that brain tissue microstructure and metabolites mature in frontal and cingulate cortices and contribute to improved self-regulation during the transition from childhood to adolescence. He further demonstrated age-related increases in prefrontal cortex and basal ganglia activation during a Stroop task was associated with improved self-regulatory control, indicating maturation of frontostriatal systems from childhood through adulthood in healthy individuals.

Peterson has studied normal cognitive and emotional processing in the brain as well. He and his colleagues, including James Russell, developed an emotion processing task based on the circumplex model of affect that explored with functional MRI the neural systems that independently subserve the valence and arousal components of a full range of normal emotions evoked by emotional words, faces, and induced moods. In collaboration with Mark Packard, he developed a virtual reality platform for use during functional MRI scanning to study procedural and declarative learning processes in both health and illness.

=== Disorders of impulse control ===
Peterson has researched disorders of impulse control, including Tourette's syndrome (TS), obsessive-compulsive disorder (OCD), and attention-deficit/hyperactivity disorder (ADHD). His imaging studies of TS subjects and controls across the lifespan have demonstrated larger prefrontal cortices in TS children, with an inverse association of these regional volumes with tic symptom severity. Prefrontal volumes in TS adults, however, were smaller than control values, likely due to the ascertainment bias of studying still-symptomatic adults, given that tic symptoms usually substantially improve by adulthood. These findings, along with earlier observations of significant prefrontal activation during tic suppression, suggested that compensatory responses involving activity-dependent plasticity and prefrontal hypertrophy play a role in controlling tic symptoms. He also established that caudate volumes in TS children predict the severity of both tics and OCD symptoms in early adulthood, even after adjusting for potential confounds. These collective results suggested that prefrontal hypertrophy acts as a compensatory response to the presence of tics, attenuating symptoms in temporal proximity to the time of volume measurement. Conversely, the magnitude of the abnormality in the caudate nucleus is more critical in predicting the long-term outcome of symptom severity in TS.

In addition, Peterson showed the presence of prominent cortical thinning in ventral portions of the sensory and motor homunculi that control the facial and vocal muscles that are commonly involved in tic symptoms. More severe thinning was associated with more severe tic symptoms, suggesting that these sensorimotor regions are important in producing tics. He also explored neural mechanisms that generate the tics, comparing brain activation during spontaneous tics in persons with TS and mimicked tics in healthy controls. Finding showed that the sensory urges that generate tics derive from greater neural activity in somatosensory cortices, putamen, and amygdala/hippocampus complex, whereas progressively weaker activity in cortical-subcortical regulatory circuits (especially the caudate and anterior cingulate cortex) accompany proportionately more severe symptoms, highlighting that faulty activity in these circuits fail to control tic behaviors and the sensory urges that generate them. Faulty activity within the subcortical portions of these circuits was further implicated in his showing that habit learning processes based within the striatum (caudate and putamen) are impaired in persons with TS in direct proportion to the severity of tic symptoms.

Peterson's functional and anatomical studies have helped to define the neural basis of ADHD. A morphological study of the cortical surface, published in The Lancet, revealed smaller volumes of inferior prefrontal and anterior temporal regions in children with ADHD, supporting the hypothesis of involvement of these regions in the pathophysiology of the disorder. Several of his functional imaging studies documented the significance of these regions in attention and behavior regulation. He demonstrated abnormal default-mode activity in ventral anterior cingulate and posterior cingulate cortices in ADHD youth, with these abnormalities normalizing in response to stimulant medications. Additionally, he showcased that stimulant medications may reverse morphological abnormalities in the basal ganglia and thalamus of youth with ADHD. He also presented evidence for neuroplastic hypertrophy in the hippocampus and amygdala of ADHD youth, potentially serving as a compensatory response to dysfunctional frontostriatal circuits elsewhere in the brain and contributing to the attenuation of ADHD symptoms.

=== Neonatal risks ===
Peterson's work on neonatal risks focused on conditions that confer risk for disturbances in development of the neonatal CNS, including premature birth, prenatal exposure to drugs of abuse, and prenatal exposure to various common environmental toxins.

Peterson published the first quantitative study of the long-term effects of preterm birth on brain development, revealing large reductions in the volumes of specific cortical regions in the preterm children, most prominently in sensorimotor regions but also in premotor, midtemporal, parieto-occipital, and subgenual cortices, correlating with IQ at age 8 and gestational age at birth, indicating that younger birth age is associated with greater abnormalities in brain structure, and larger abnormalities in brain structure are associated with lower IQ. Using fMRI in the same group, he demonstrated that while term-born children activated typical language areas during meaningful speech perception, prematurely born children activated these regions during meaningful speech similarly to how term-born children responded to nonsensical, phonemic sounds. He concluded that the unusual activation during meaningful speech in preterm children was linked to lower verbal IQ and reduced comprehension of meaningful stories. Subsequently, he examined brain volumes in preterm and term infants near their term due dates, observing a consistent pattern of anatomical abnormalities similar to those identified in 8-year-old prematurely born infants, suggesting that specific brain region morphological abnormalities are present soon after preterm birth.

In addition, Peterson conducted imaging on a cohort of over 180 newborns, with 45 exposed in utero to crack cocaine, 45 to narcotics, 45 to cannabis, and 45 unexposed to any drugs of abuse, finding notable abnormalities in brain structure, connectivity, and function in drug-exposed infants at birth. He collaborated with researchers at Columbia's School of Public Health, scanning 450 children in a longitudinal study on the impact of prenatal exposure to environmental toxins, including household insecticides, and found that prenatal exposure to the organophosphate insecticide chlorpyrifos increased white matter volumes in specific brain regions in proportion to cumulative exposure and associated IQ impairment, influencing an FDA review of chlorpyrifos use in the U.S. as an agricultural pesticide. Furthermore, he showcased that prenatal exposure to PM_{2.5} and PAH disrupts brain development in youth, affecting anatomy, microstructure, and function, with implications for cognitive, emotional, and behavioral outcomes.

=== Affective disorders ===
Peterson has studied the brain bases of affective disorders, including bipolar disorder (BD) and major depression. Using a self-regulatory task, he found that adults with BD exhibited deficient left inferior prefrontal cortex activation, indicating a potential trait abnormality. The BD group also showed reduced amygdala (16%) and hippocampus (5%) volumes, likely emerging early in the illness course. These and other related findings suggested the presence of faulty circuits that regulate emotions, with mesial temporal lobe structures losing normal top-down control from frontal cortices, potentially generating the mood changes of BD.

Peterson, along with Myrna Weissman and colleagues, identified a brain-based endophenotype for major depressive disorder (MDD), characterized by cortical thinning across the lateral surface of the right hemisphere and associated white matter abnormalities. This endophenotype, linked to familial risk for MDD, correlated with inattention and poor visual memory. He established neural patterns associated with depression risk (cortical attention circuits), resilience (dorsal anterior cingulate cortex), and enduring effects following illness (default mode circuits) as well, highlighting potential endophenotypes for novel interventions.

Additionally, Peterson demonstrated that treatment with duloxetine attenuates and normalizes excessive activity and network connectivity in dysthymic individuals. His research also illuminated that in patients with depressive disorders, duloxetine treatment induces changes in cortical gray matter morphology that likely represent neuroanatomical plasticity, and it normalizes N-acetyl-aspartate (NAA) concentrations by modulating depressive symptom severity, revealing the relationship between neurochemistry and depressive symptoms.

=== Autism spectrum disorders ===
Peterson used multiple MRI modalities to explore the brain basis for the heterogeneity of symptoms in autism spectrum disorder (ASD). He observed that brain lactate, indicating the presence of mitochondrial dysfunction, was significantly greater in individuals with ASD, suggesting a possible neurobiological subtype of ASD. He also found that metabolite concentrations were altered in regions of the brain subserving socialization in persons with ASD, and in proportion to the severity of ASD symptom scores. In another study, participants with ASD showed widespread alterations in regional brain blood flow, correlating with socialization deficits and suggesting potential metabolic disturbances that impact neural efficiency and trigger compensatory glial responses. Alongside colleagues, he showed that ASD participants exhibited altered white matter microstructure that adversely impact blood flow, symptoms, and cognitive abilities. He further used functional MRI to demonstrate that persons with ASD processed and likely experienced emotional stimuli very differently from the way typically developing persons did, and moreover that these differences were specific to the arousal components of facial emotions but not valence components.

=== Development of new imaging technologies ===
Peterson led a research program with collaborators that developed new methods for acquisition and processing of MRI data, including deformation-based analyses for anatomical data processing, noise reduction in diffusion tensor images, statistical techniques for intergroup comparison of diffusion tensor images, enhanced signal-to-noise ratios in spectroscopic images, and improved head coils for human and animal imaging. His team developed software supporting virtual reality platforms for use in fMRI scanning. Furthermore, he and Ravi Bansal developed software capable of diagnosing psychiatric disorders based solely on an individual's anatomical brain image.

== Awards and honors ==
- 2006, 2014 – Outstanding Mentor, the American Academy of Child & Adolescent Psychiatry
- 2007 – John J. Weber Prize, Columbia University
- 2012 – Blanche Ittleson Award, American Psychiatric Association
- 2012 – Excellence in Teaching, New York Presbyterian Hospital of Columbia and Cornell Universities
- 2017 – Dean's Teaching Award, Keck School of Medicine
- 2024 – Leadership in Child, Adolescent and Young Adult Psychiatry, American College of Psychiatrists

== Selected articles ==
- Peterson, B. S., Skudlarski, P., Gatenby, J. C., Zhang, H., Anderson, A. W., & Gore, J. C. (1999). An fMRI study of Stroop word-color interference: evidence for cingulate subregions subserving multiple distributed attentional systems. Biological psychiatry, 45(10), 1237–1258.
- Peterson, B. S., Vohr, B., Staib, L. H., Cannistraci, C. J., Dolberg, A., Schneider, K. C., ... & Ment, L. R. (2000). Regional brain volume abnormalities and long-term cognitive outcome in preterm infants. JAMA, 284, 1939–1947.
- Sowell, E. R., Thompson, P. M., Welcome, S. E., Henkenius, A. L., Toga, A. W., & Peterson, B. S. (2003). Cortical abnormalities in children and adolescents with attention-deficit hyperactivity disorder. The Lancet, 362(9397), 1699–1707.
- Posner, J., Russell, J. A., & Peterson, B. S. (2005). The circumplex model of affect: An integrative approach to affective neuroscience, cognitive development, and psychopathology. Development and psychopathology, 17(3), 715–734.
- Sowell, E. R., Kan, E., Yoshii, J., Thompson, P. M., Bansal, R., Xu, D., ... & Peterson, B. S. (2008). Thinning of sensorimotor cortices in children with Tourette syndrome. Nature neuroscience, 11(6), 637–639.
- Peterson, B. S., Warner, V., Bansal, R., Zhu, H., Hao, X., Liu, J., ... & Weissman, M. M. (2009). Cortical thinning in persons at increased familial risk for major depression. Proceedings of the National Academy of Sciences, 106(15), 6273–6278.
- Tau, G. Z., & Peterson, B. S. (2010). Normal development of brain circuits. Neuropsychopharmacology, 35(1), 147–168.
- Peterson, B. S., Rosen, T., Dingman, S., Toth, Z. R., Sawardekar, S., Hao, X., ... & Bansal, R. (2020). Associations of maternal prenatal drug abuse with measures of newborn brain structure, tissue organization, and metabolite concentrations. JAMA pediatrics, 174(9), 831–842.
- Siegel, P., Wang, Z., Murray, L., Campos, J., Sims, V., Leighton, E., & Peterson, B. S. (2020). Brain-based mediation of non-conscious reduction of phobic avoidance in young women during functional MRI: a randomised controlled experiment. The Lancet Psychiatry, 7(11), 971–981.
- Peterson, B. S., Bansal, R., Sawardekar, S., Nati, C., Elgabalawy, E. R., Hoepner, L. A., ... & Rauh, V. (2022). Prenatal exposure to air pollution is associated with altered brain structure, function, and metabolism in childhood. Journal of Child Psychology and Psychiatry, 63(11), 1316–1331.
