= Bradley Osborne =

South African cricketer (born 1962)

Personal information
- Born: 18 January 1962 (age 64); Durban, South Africa
- Source: Cricinfo, 12 December 2020

Bradley Osborne (born 18 January 1962) is a South African cricketer. He played in 72 first-class and 80 List A matches from 1979/80 to 1994/95.
