= Chiditarod =

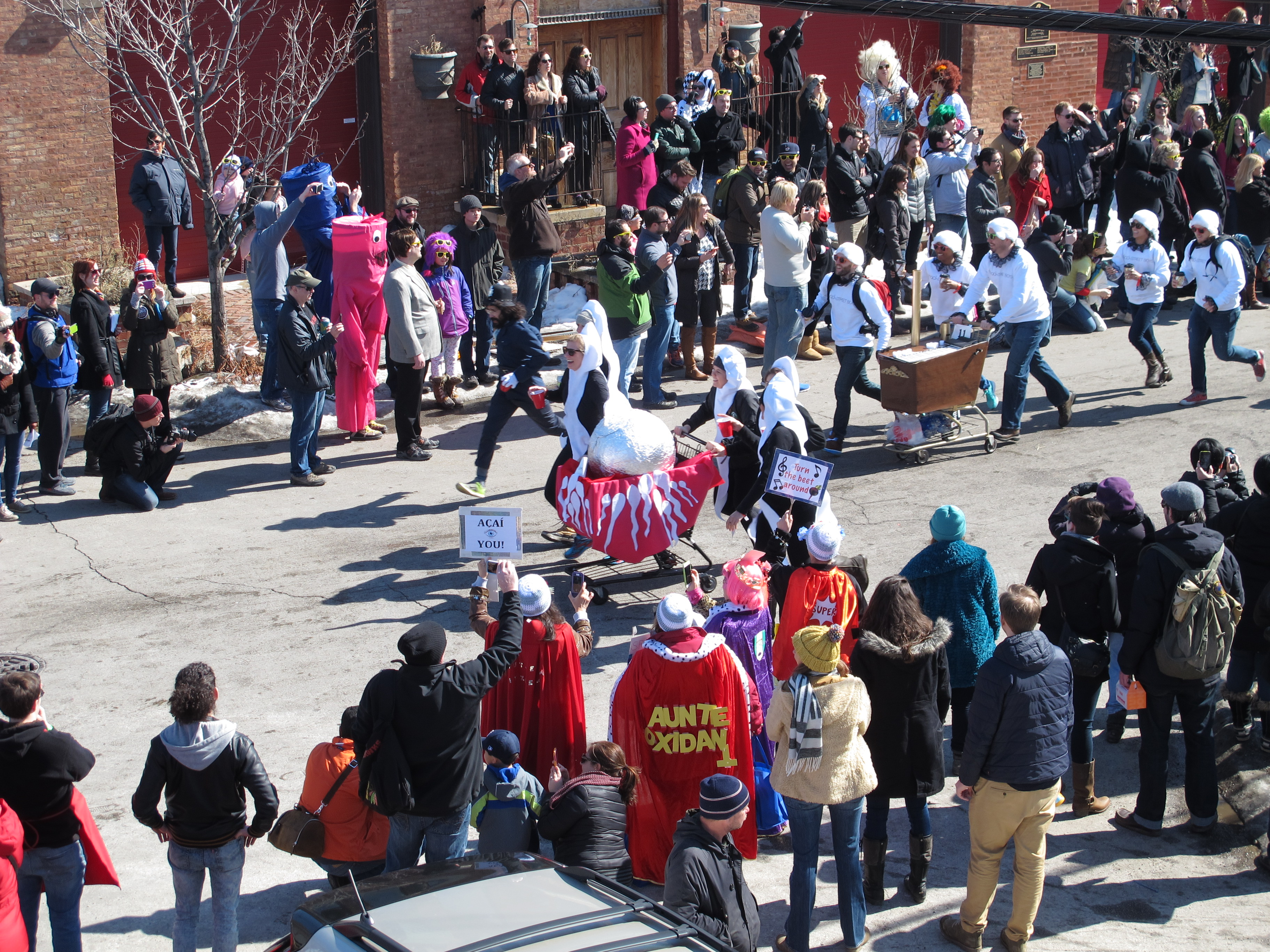
Attendees at Chiditarod 2015

CHIditarod is a Chicago-based shopping cart-race and food drive. Attendees typically dress in costume. It is managed by the 501(c)(3) non-profit CHIditarod Foundation. The name is a play on words combining Chicago and Iditarod, a dogsled race. CHIditarod is not related to the Iditarod in any way.
