= Bradley Hart =

Canadian contemporary artist

Bradley Hart is a New York-based Canadian contemporary artist, best known for the photorealistic portraits that he creates by injecting paint into bubble wrap.

== Early life and education ==
Hart was born in Toronto, Ontario, Canada. The Hart family business of restaurant design and construction introduced young Bradley to the workings within wood and metal shops, where his interest in the creative process was kindled. At age 11, Hart was enrolled into Thornton Hall, a private art school where he took classical art training including the replication of Renaissance masters works for 20 hours a week.

In 2002, Hart received his B.A. from the University of Toronto, Canada, with a double major in Visual Art and Semiotic Communication Theory and a minor in Cinema Studies.

Hart relocated to New York City in 2008, where he lives and works today.

== Artistic Style ==
"I interpreted his work as, mostly, process art, as a way of taking something valueless and inconsequential and finding a hidden quality and potential in it that lay unexploited due to the extreme effort necessary to utilize it."

— Deborah Zafman, The Madness to Bradley Hart's Method

Hart works mainly with bubble wrap as his unique canvas and creative material. According to the artist, the idea of turning the commonly used packing plastic into art came from his encounter of overly protective museum security guards and a leftover roll of bubble from his first solo show in New York. Since then, Hart has developed "a conceptually complex and elaborate system that includes the perpetual invention of mechanized methods allowing for his art to spawn more art."

=== Injections ===
Hart's oeuvre of interrelated series initiates with the Injection paintings. The subjects of Hart's paintings, ranging from portraiture of celebrities and friends to full-scale scenery and snapshots of life, come from his personal photograph collection. Using software that he developed with a friend, Hart assigns a color code to each bubble which corresponds with a paint-loaded syringe. The artist then injects the acrylic paint into each cell of the bubble wrap, resulting in pixelated hyperrealist recreations of the chosen images.

On average, it takes Hart about 150 hours to finish each Injection work.

=== Impressions ===
While injecting, Hart intentionally overfills the bubbles with a calculated amount of paint so that the excess paint would drip down the flat side of the bubble wrap. The drips fuse upon drying and are then removed from the plastic. This layer becomes the next series, titled Impression, which is a natural byproduct of the previous Injection work and yet constitutes an independent body of works on its own.

=== Assemblages ===
Hart recycles at every level of his studio practice. Dried paint from the mixing jars and studio surfaces, such as the floor, palette, the bubble wrap and the drop sheet, is collected and assembled to produce either the Created Waste or the Wasted Paint series. Intention distinguishes the two. For Creative Waste, the artist decisively spills the acrylic in a way that mimics the natural splatters from his previous series. Wasted Paint, on the other hand, is composed solely of accidental spills including those produced in the Created Waste process. Hart related during an interview that "[t]he created waste and the waste paint series are created through an emotional response to what I see much like an action painter but for me it is more sculptural than painterly," and that different series provided him with different types of satisfaction.

== Exhibitions ==
=== Solo exhibitions ===
2015 Descendants, Anna Zorina Gallery, New York City
2014 The Masters Interpreted, Cavalier Galleries, New York City
2013 SCOPE, Cavalier Galleries, Miami, Florida
2013 An Artist’s Impressions, RePopRoom, New York City
2013 The Bubble Wrap Proposition: Chapter 1, Cavalier Galleries, Greenwich, Connecticut
2012 What? Where? When? Why? How?, Gallery Nine5, New York City
2009 Signature New York, Chashama Gallery, New York City
2009 I was here, Union Square Subway Terminal, New York City

=== Selected group exhibitions ===
2015 Raw Pop, Castle Fitzjohns Gallery, New York City
2015 Pixelated, Children's Museum of the Arts, New York City
2015 FACES, Anna Zorina Gallery, New York City
2014 Exploring the Unconventional, Cavalier Gallery, Greenwich, Connecticut
2014 Contemporary Realism, Cavalier Galleries, New York City
2014 Summer Group Show, Cavalier Gallery, Greenwich, Connecticut
2014 West Palm Beach Art Show, Palm Beach, Florida
2014 Naples National Art Festival, Naples, Florida
2013 Figurative Group Show, Cavalier Gallery, Greenwich, Connecticut
2013 Group Show, Cavalier Galleries, New York City
2013 Systems, Rockland Center for the Arts, West Nyack, New York
2013 Summer Group Show, Cavalier Galleries, Greenwich, Connecticut
2013 SCOPE, Gallery Nine5, New York City
2013 West Palm Beach Art Show, Palm Beach, Florida
2013 Naples National Art Festival, Naples, Florida
2011 Mott Haven Open Studio Expo, New York City
2011 Salon Show, Greenpoint Gallery, New York City
2011 No Comment Art III, Pop-Up Show, New York City
2010 Mott Haven Open Studio Expo, New York City
2009 The Bookmark Project Obsolete, Koffler Center of the Arts, Toronto, Canada
2009 People, Eggs, Hats, and Abstractions, Bruckner Gallery, New York City
2002 Sweet Heartache, Propeller Center for the Visual Arts, Toronto, Canada
2002 Insulated 1, Spadina Circle, Toronto, Canada
2002 Transcript, University of Toronto, Toronto, Canada
2001 Juried Exhibition, University of Toronto, Toronto, Canada
2001 Annex Outdoor Patio Art Show, Toronto, Canada
2001 Exhibition of commissioned work, St. Joseph Medical Center, Toronto, Canada
