= Caribou Legs =

Canadian long-distance runner (born c. 1971)

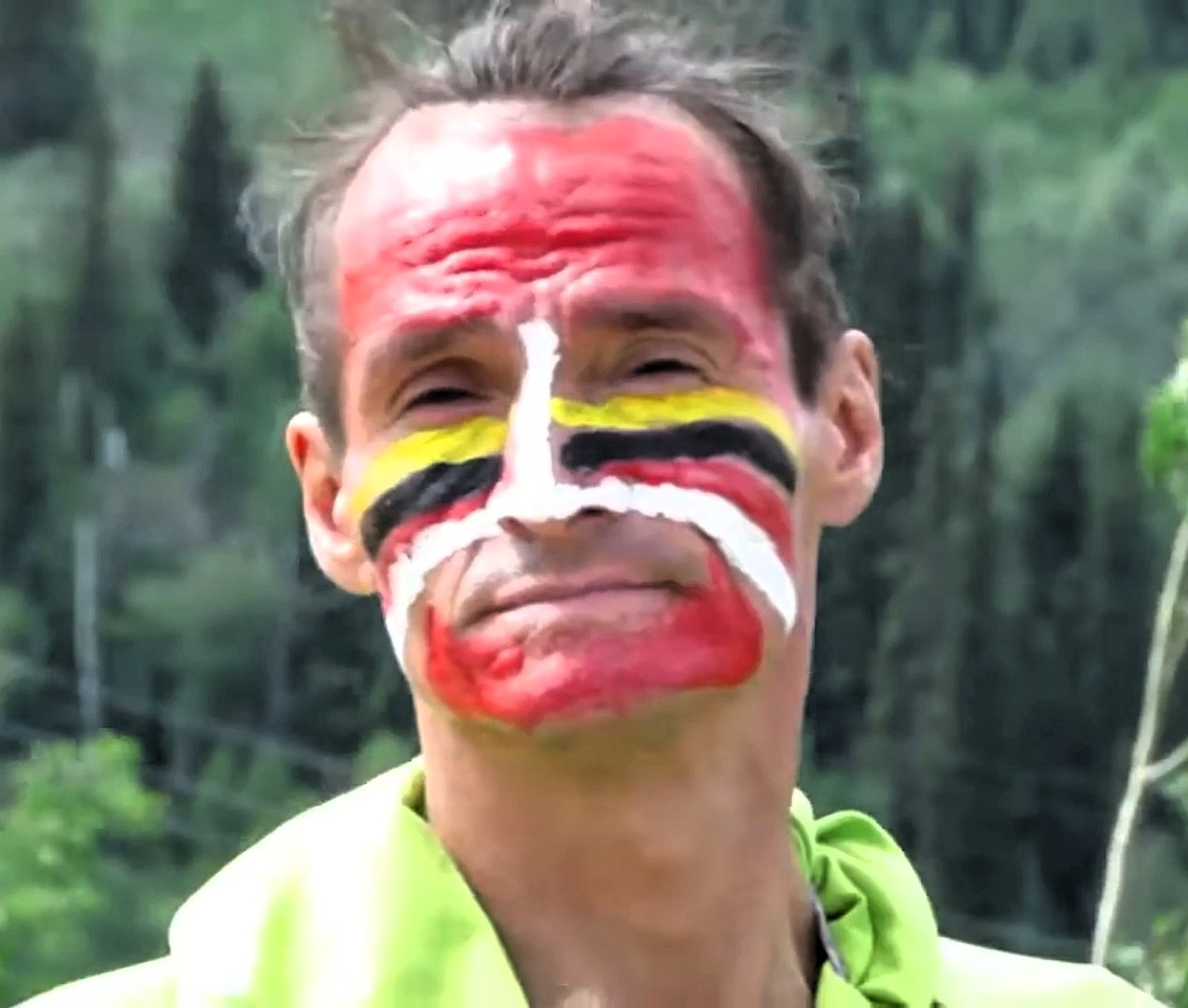
- Firth in 2016
- Born: Brad Firth c. 1970 (age 54–55); Inuvik, Northwest Territories, Canada
- Known for: Ultra-marathon running
- Relatives: Sharon Firth (aunt); Shirley Firth (aunt)

Brad Firth (born c. 1970), known as Caribou Legs, is a Gwichʼin Canadian ultramarathon runner who has made multiple long-distance runs across Canadian provinces to spread awareness about various causes.

In 2013, he ran 740 kilometres (460 mi) to raise awareness for addiction. The following year, he ran a total distance of approximately 5,000 kilometres (3,100 mi) over two journeys to spread awareness and protect the Peel watershed. In 2016, he ran a total of 7,400 kilometres (4,600 mi) to raise awareness about Missing and Murdered Indigenous Women. The next year, he completed two notable runs, including one across the Great Slave Lake, a distance of 200 kilometres (120 mi), over five days and another to raise awareness about the Highway of Tears.

== Biography ==
Brad Firth was born c. 1970, in Inuvik, Northwest Territories, where he was raised by his grandparents. His mother died in a fire when he was nine. He has at least two sisters. He states that many in his town growing up dealt with drug abuse and systemic violence due to the residential school system. His aunts are Canadian cross-country skiers and Olympians Sharon and Shirley Firth. Caribou Legs is a member of the Gwichʼin First Nation. He was given the name 'Caribou Legs' by a family member.

Caribou Legs began running after being encouraged to do so by a Vancouver police officer. At the time, he struggled with homelessness and drug addiction. After joining running clubs, he began training to run marathons. He has stated that running helped him recover from drug addiction. He competed in his first marathon in 2005, then in 2010, first qualified for the Boston Marathon, with a time of three hours and seven minutes. From there, he began running ultra-marathons, including at least five runs that crossed multiple Canadian provinces. In 2013, Caribou Legs ran from Fort Smith, Northwest Territories to Yellowknife, a distance of 740 kilometres (460 mi), to raise awareness of addiction. According to a CTV News report, Caribou Legs does not "travel with a support team or announce his route ahead of time".

Caribou Legs has made two journeys to spread awareness about protecting the Peel watershed. In 2014, he ran from Inuvik, Northwest Territories to Whitehorse, Yukon, a distance of 1,200 kilometres (750 mi). Along the path, he collected letters protesting the government's plan for the land; he delivered the letters to members of the Yukon government, including then-Premier Darrell Pasloski. After running between 40 kilometres (25 mi) and 60 kilometres (37 mi) daily, he often slept on the side of the road, though supporters sometimes supported him financially and provided overnight accommodations. In 2014, Caribou Legs ran from Vancouver, British Columbia to Ottawa, Ontario, a distance of 3,800 kilometres (2,400 mi), for the same cause.

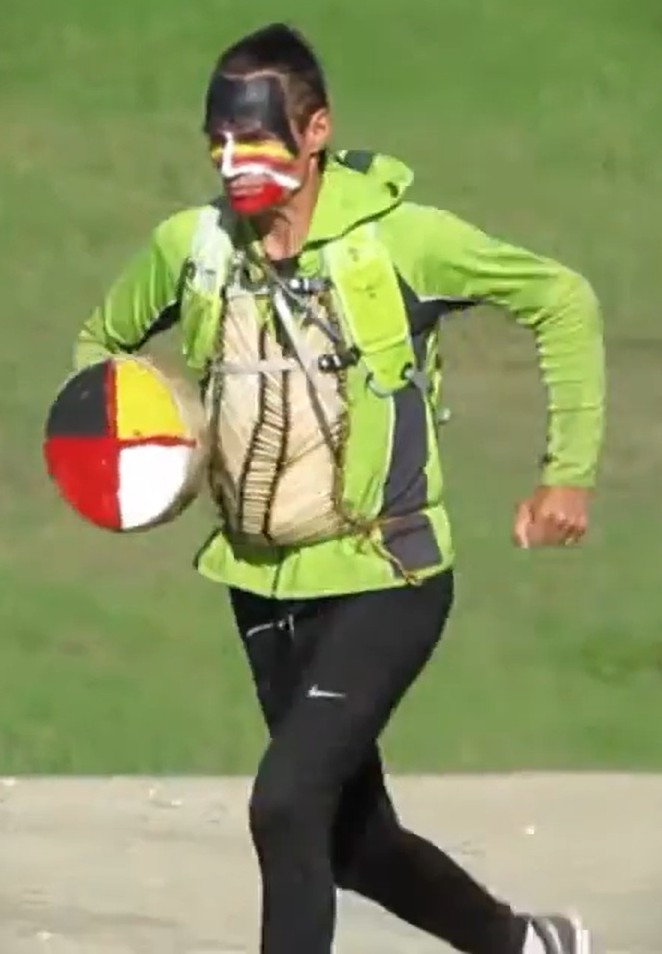
Caribou Legs runs in 2016

In 2016, Caribou Legs ran from Vancouver to St. John's, Newfoundland and Labrador, a distance of over 7,400 kilometres (4,600 mi), to spread awareness about Missing and Murdered Indigenous Women. He was inspired to run after he believed his sister Irene died from domestic violence the year before, though a later lawsuit found the claim to be defamatory. Running up to 80 kilometres (50 mi) daily, the journey took six months, spanning from May to November. While running cross-country, Caribou Legs dressed in traditional regalia. Along the route, he stopped to give speeches about consent to youth. The run was captured in the short film Caribou Legs.

Caribou Legs completed two long-distance runs in 2017. In March, he ran 200 kilometres (120 mi) across Great Slave Lake in the Northwest Territories over five days. He was escorted along the path by Canadian Rangers, who also took the opportunity to learn more about the terrain. To keep warm, he wore a traditional caribou parka and boots. In November, he ran 700 kilometres (430 mi) over 21 days from Prince George, British Columbia to Prince Rupert, British Columbia to raise awareness about the Highway of Tears, a stretch of Canadian highway infamous for disappearances and murders of Indigenous women.

Caribou Legs has stated he intends to complete a run to honour children who attended residential schools.
