= Bradley (ward) =

- Shown within Pendle
- Area: 1.62 km^{2} (0.63 sq mi)
- Population: 6,489 (2011)
  - Density: 4,006/km^{2} (10,380/sq mi)
- District: Pendle
- Ceremonial county: Lancashire
- Region: North West
- Country: England
- Sovereign state: United Kingdom
- UK Parliament: Pendle and Clitheroe
- Councillors: Mohammed Iqbal (Labour); Mohammed Sakib (Labour); Nadeem Younis (Labour)

Bradley is one of the 20 electoral wards that form the Parliamentary constituency of Pendle, Lancashire, England. The ward elects three councillors to represent the Bradley area, the north-west part of Nelson, on Pendle Borough Council. At the May 2011 Council election, Bradley had an electorate of 4,581.

This ward was subject to boundary changes in 2021, and an election took place on 6 May 2021, to elect all members of Pendle Borough Council in England. The ward returns two Labour Councillors, and one Conservative Councillor.

== Demographics ==
Bradley has a high proportion of residents from ethnic minorities. 38.5 per cent of the population are of Pakistani origin.

== 2021 Election Results ==
Bradley
Party	Candidate	Votes	%	±%
Labour	Mohammed Iqbal*	1,665	50.3	
Conservative	Mohammad Aslam*	1,625	49.0	
Labour	Mohammad Sakib*	1,416	42.7	
Conservative	Mohammad Kaleem	1,381	41.7	
Conservative	Hassan Mahmood	1,375	41.5	
Labour	Sadaf Khan	1,307	39.5	
Liberal Democrats	David Robert Clamp	205	6.2	
Liberal Democrats	Jodie Marie Hoyle	201	6.1	
Turnout		3,313	52.58	
Labour win (new seat)				
Conservative win (new seat)				
Labour win (new seat)				

== Previous Election results ==
Year elected	Councillor	Majority	%
2007	Nadeem Younis (Labour)	226	44.0
2008	Mohammed Sakib (Labour)	472	27.0
2010	Mohammed Iqbal MBE (Labour)	570	19.9
2011	Nadeem Younis (Labour)	1,121	59.0
2012	Mohammad Sakib (Labour)	478	55.0
2014	Mohammed Iqbal MBE (Labour)	868	67.2
2015	Nadeem Younis (Labour)	1,460	68.6
2016	Mohammad Sakib (Labour)	1,057	47.1
2018	Mohammad Iqbal MBE (Labour)	1,304	52.1
2019	Mohammad Aslam (Conservative)	44	50.9
