= Brad Smith (American football, born 1950) =

American football coach (born c. 1950)

Biographical details
- Born: c. 1950 (age 75–76); Sycamore, Illinois, U.S.

Playing career
- 1968–1971: Western Illinois
- Position: Cornerback

Coaching career (HC unless noted)
- 1972–1973: Chadron State (assistant)
- 1974: Milwaukee (DB)
- 1975–1977: Alliance HS (NE)
- 1978–1981: William Horlick HS (WI)
- 1982–1985: Western Illinois (DB/PGC)
- 1986: Western Illinois (DC)
- 1987–2004: Chadron State
- 2011: Chadron State (interim HC)

Administrative career (AD unless noted)
- 1987–2012: Chadron State

Head coaching record
- Overall: 128–55 (college); 34–28–1 (high school)
- Tournaments: 0–6

Accomplishments and honors

Championships
- 5 RMAC (1996, 1998–1999, 2001–2002) Norwegian Champions 2014

Awards
- 3× RMAC Coach of the Year (1996, 1999, 2001)

Brad Smith (born c. 1950) is a former American college football coach and athletic director. He was most recently the interim head football coach for Chadron State College team in 2011. He was the head coach previously from 1987 to 2004. He also coached for Milwaukee, Alliance High School, William Horlick High School, and Western Illinois. He served as the athletic director for Chadron State from 1987 to 2012. He also served as head coach for the Norwegian team Kristiansand Gladiators during the 2014 season where he led the team to a national championship.

== Head coaching record ==
Year	Team	Overall	Conference	Standing	Bowl/playoffs	NAIA D2^{#}	AFCA^{°}
Chadron State Eagles (NAIA Division II independent) (1987–1990)
1987	Chadron State	1–8					
1988	Chadron State	5–5					
1989	Chadron State	8–2			L NAIA Division II First Round	10	
1990	Chadron State	9–2			L NAIA Division II First Round	7	
Chadron State Eagles (Rocky Mountain Athletic Conference) (1991–2003)
1991	Chadron State	5–5–1	3–3	T–3rd			
1992	Chadron State	7–3	5–2	3rd			
1993	Chadron State	5–6	2–5	6th			
1994	Chadron State	9–2	5–2	3rd			
1995	Chadron State	8–2	5–2	3rd			
1996	Chadron State	10–2	7–1	1st	L NCAA Division II First Round		11
1997	Chadron State	8–3	6–2	T–2nd			
1998	Chadron State	9–3	7–1	T–1st	L NCAA Division II First Round		19
1999	Chadron State	7–3	7–1	T–1st			
2000	Chadron State	8–3	7–1	2nd	L NCAA Division II First Round		4
2001	Chadron State	10–1	8–0	1st	L NCAA Division II First Round		3
2002	Chadron State	8–2	7–1	T–1st			22
2003	Chadron State	8–2	6–2	2nd			22
Chadron State Eagles (Rocky Mountain Athletic Conference) (2011)
2011	Chadron State	3–1 (Note: Smith was named interim head coach with four weeks remaining in the season following the firing of Bill O'Boyle.)	3–1	T–3rd			
Chadron State:		128–55	78–24				
Total:		128–55					
National championship Conference title Conference division title or championship game berth
