= Brad Farmer =

Australian advocate

Bradley Paul Farmer AM is an Australian conservationist. He was awarded a Member of the Order of Australia on the 2019 Queens Birthday Honours List for service towards conservation. He is an adviser of Australian coastal conservancy.

== Bibliography ==
- Short, Andy; Farmer, Brad (2012). 101 Best Australian Beaches. NewSouth Publishing. ISBN 978-1-74223-322-2.
