= Bradley Gamble =

English footballer

Personal information
- Full name: Bradley David Gamble
- Date of birth: 4 February 1975 (age 51)
- Place of birth: Southwark, England
- Position: Forward

Team information
- Current team: West Wight Football Club

Youth career
- Leyton Orient

Senior career*
Years	Team	Apps	(Gls)
1993–1994	Leyton Orient	6	(1)
1994–1995	Welling United		(2)
1995–2001	Fisher Athletic		
- * Club domestic league appearances and goals

Bradley David Gamble (born 4 February 1975) is an English former footballer who played as a forward in the Football League for Leyton Orient and in non-league football for Welling United.
