= Brad Smith (entrepreneur) =

Australian businessman

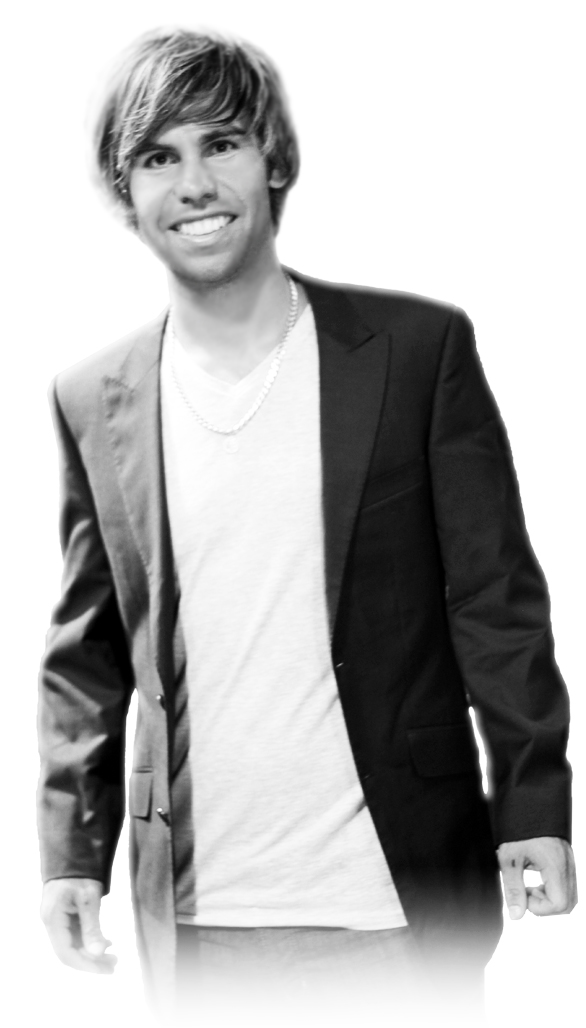
- Born: 1 July 1987 (age 39); Launceston, Tasmania, Australia
- Occupations: Entrepreneur; Motocross Champion
- Years active: 2007 – present

Bradley Smith (born 1 July 1987) is an Australian entrepreneur and former motocross rider, who founded the motocross brand “Braaap”. In 2010 he was named Young Australian of the Year for Tasmania, Australian Young Entrepreneur of the year and International Young Entrepreneur of the year runner up.

In 2008, Smith launched the first Braaap store, a retail outlet in Australia. Braaap expanded to a total of four retail outlets across Tasmania and Victoria.

== Personal life ==
Smith was born in Launceston, Tasmania, Australia. on the 1st of june 1988.

== Braaap ==
The first Braaap store opened in Launceston in 2005 with additional Tasmanian stores in Hobart and Devonport. Another store of his opened in Frankston, Victoria.

Braaap motorcycles were manufactured in China. The motorcycles were assembled locally in Braaap stores.

Closure of Braaap retail outlets began with Devonport in June 2013, Hobart in July 2017, and Launceston in January 2018.

Braaap Motorcycles Pty Ltd was ordered into liquidation by the NSW Supreme Court on August 7, owing 121 unsecured creditors at least $1.074million.

== Australian Superlite Champion ==
In June 2010, Smith was placed as the highest ranking Australian at the World Mini SX Championships in Las Vegas. After the 2010 World finals, he finished in 11th place, competing against full-time professional riders from around the world.
