= Bradley Kilgore =

American chef

Bradley Kilgore (born 1986) is an American chef based in Miami, Florida.

== Early life and education ==
Kilgore was born in 1986 in Overland Park, Kansas. By the age of 12, Kilgore was making French toast and pancakes in a local diner to support his family. In Overland Park, Kilgore enrolled in culinary classes at Broadmoor Technical Center. After abandoning HVAC certification he decided to try his hand at cooking. After spending time in Italy, Kilgore finished his studies at Johnson and Wales University in Denver, Colorado.

== Restaurants ==
In 2010, Kilgore served as executive sous chef at EPIC in Chicago. The restaurant earned three stars from the Chicago Tribune. In 2011, Kilgore moved to Miami where he was the executive sous chef at Azul. After his time at Azul, Kilgore was the executive chef at the J&G Grill, Jean-Georges Vongerichten's restaurant in Bal Harbour.

Kilgore made a name for himself when he opened Alter in 2015. Located in the Wynwood neighborhood, Alter focuses on New American cuisine, highlighting indigenous Floridian ingredients.

In his role as the Culinary Director of the Adrienne Arsht Center for the Performing Arts in Miami, Kilgore opened his Italian-based, signature restaurant, Brava by Brad Kilgore.

In 2018, Kilgore opened Kaido in Miami's Design District alongside mixologist Nico de Soto. Kaido is a Japanese-inspired restaurant with an emphasis on creative drinks. In May 2019, Kilgore opened his fourth restaurant, Ember, an American bistro, downstairs from Kaido.

After the Covid-19 pandemic, Kilgore closed his Miami-based restaurant group and transitioned into hospitality consulting.

Kilgore contributed to two books, Eat the Problem and Crossing Borders.

In 2017, Kilgore appeared on Bizarre Foods with Andrew Zimmern.

== Awards ==
While working as executive chef at J&G Grill, the restaurant received four stars from the Miami Herald, the only restaurant in Miami to receive that rating.

When Kilgore opened Alter, it was named "Restaurant of the Year" by the Miami Herald and a semi-finalist for James Beard's "Best New Restaurant." Alter received four stars from the Miami Herald in November 2015, making Kilgore the only chef to receive four stars twice from the Miami Herald.

In 2016 and 2017, Kilgore was named in the category Rising Star chef of the year. Also in 2016 Bradley was named Best New Chef in America by Food & Wine Magazine and Alter was named a Diners Discovery from San Pellegrino "The World’s 50 Best".

== Personal life ==
Kilgore is married to Soraya Caraccioli-Kilgore, pastry chef for Alter and Brava and owner of MadLabCreamery in the Miami Design District.
