= Bradley Theodore =

Visual artist

Bradley Theodore is a visual artist. Born in the Turks and Caicos Islands, he now resides in New York City. Theodore gained prominence as an artist through the popularity of a street art murals of fashion icons Anna Wintour and Karl Lagerfeld.

Theodore's work includes murals and paintings of fashion influencers, including Kate Moss, Coco Chanel with Frida Kahlo, Tom Ford, and Diana Vreeland. He also does digital artwork, and was included in Google's virtual reality-focused Artist in Residency program. Theodore has worked on campaigns for brands Moët, Jordan Brand, RMK, Kent & Curwen, and Moleskine. He has also worked with hip-hop collective Wu-Tang Clan, provided images for Sony and Universal Records, and created logos for camera manufacturer Leica Camera and board game Monopoly.

An alum of the School of Visual Arts, Theodore's works are recognized by his “use of saturated colors, skull motifs and vivid skeletal interpretations” of popular cultural icons and celebrities.

Theodore's life and entrance to the art world was the subject of the documentary “Becoming: Bradley Theodore,” which premiered at the 2016 Tribeca Film Festival.

== Career ==
Theodore was the official artist for the 2016 US Open, and created four murals on display at the tournament's venue, Great Hall of Louis Armstrong Stadium. In 2018, Theodore designed a limited edition series of sneakers and garments for the 50th anniversary of PUMA Suede. Theodore was the artist behind the décor for The Court — a private members' club that opened in 2019, and located on the formerly Kingly Street site in London, England.
