= Brad MacGregor =

Canadian ice hockey player

- Born: July 22, 1964 (age 61) Edmonton, Alberta, Canada
- Height: 6 ft 1 in (185 cm)
- Weight: 190 lb (86 kg; 13 st 8 lb)
- Position: Centre
- Shot: Left
- Played for: AHL; Nova Scotia Oilers; Cape Breton Oilers; IHL; Saginaw Generals; Saginaw Hawks
- NHL draft: Undrafted
- Playing career: 1986–1989

Brad MacGregor (born July 22, 1964) is a Canadian former professional ice hockey player.

MacGregor attended Boston University, where he played four seasons (1982–1986) of NCAA college hockey with the Boston University Terriers, scoring 24 goals and 43 assists for 67 points while earning 86 penalty minutes in 150 games played.

MacGregor went on to play three seasons of professional hockey, playing in both the American Hockey League and International Hockey League, before hanging up his skates following the 1988–89 AHL season spent with the Cape Breton Oilers.

In 1989, MacGregor joined the Edmonton Oilers of the National Hockey League as a sales and marketing representative. He was the vice-president of sales when he let go by the Oilers in October 2011.

== Career statistics ==
			Regular season					Playoffs
Season	Team	League	GP	G	A	Pts	PIM	GP	G	A	Pts	PIM
1981–82	Sherwood Park Crusaders	AJHL	59	22	50	72	30	—	—	—	—	—
1982–83	Boston University	NCAA	28	5	6	11	8	—	—	—	—	—
1983–84	Boston University	NCAA	38	5	16	21	28	—	—	—	—	—
1984–85	Boston University	NCAA	41	10	10	20	30	—	—	—	—	—
1985–86	Boston University	NCAA	43	4	11	15	20	—	—	—	—	—
1986–87	Nova Scotia Oilers	AHL	47	2	6	8	6	—	—	—	—	—
1986–87	Saginaw Generals	IHL	13	4	8	12	4	10	3	6	9	2
1987–88	Saginaw Hawks	IHL	77	11	13	24	46	9	0	1	1	4
1988–89	Cape Breton Oilers	AHL	31	8	8	16	8	—	—	—	—	—
AHL totals			78	10	14	24	14	—	—	—	—	—
IHL totals			90	15	21	36	50	19	3	7	10	6
