= Bradley Beattie =

English footballer

Personal information
- Date of birth: 20 August 1957 (age 69)
- Place of birth: Torquay, England
- Position: Inside forward

Youth career
- Torquay United

Senior career*
Years	Team	Apps	(Gls)
1974–1975	Torquay United	4	(0)
1975–1976	Bath City	2	(0)
- * Club domestic league appearances and goals

Bradley Beattie (born 20 August 1957) is an English former footballer born in Torquay, Devon, who played in the Football League for Torquay United and in Non-League football for Bath City.

Beattie, an inside forward, was an apprentice with Torquay United when he made his league debut on 20 April 1974 against Chester at Plainmoor in place of regular number 8, Eddie Rowles. Although Rowles returned for the following game, Beattie kept his place, at the expense of Dave Kennedy. He failed to establish himself the following season, making just two appearances, both as a substitute. The first was in December 1974 as a replacement for Dave Tearse in a 0–0 draw at home to Swansea City, with the second, his final appearance for Torquay on 1 February 1975 as a replacement for Andy Provan in a 3–1 defeat at home to Lincoln City.

He subsequently joined Bath City, scoring once from four games in a brief stay.
