= Bradley Robinson (cricketer) =

Zimbabwean cricketer (born 1975)

Personal information
- Full name: Bradley Ian Robinson
- Born: 14 March 1975 (age 51); Salisbury, Rhodesia
- Batting: Right-handed
- Role: Wicket-keeper
- Relatives: Ian Robinson (father)

Domestic team information
- Years: Team
- 1994/95–1999/2000: Mashonaland
- FC debut: 10 March 1995 Mashonaland v Mashonaland Country Districts
- Last FC: 7 April 2000 Mashonaland v Manicaland
- Only LA: 11 January 1998 Zimbabwe A v Northerns

Career statistics
Competition	First-class	List A
Matches	10	1
Runs scored	190	13
Batting average	17.27	13.00
100s/50s	0/1	0/0
Top score	61	13
Catches/stumpings	17/3	0/0
- Source: Cricinfo, 20 September 2018

Bradley Ian Robinson (born 14 March 1975) is a former Zimbabwean cricketer who played for the Mashonaland cricket team from 1995 to 2000. He is a sports physiotherapist.

Robinson was born in Salisbury in what was then Rhodesia in 1975. He is the son of former Test cricket umpire Ian Robinson. He played in 10 first-class cricket matches for Mashonaland and for a Zimbabwe Board XI as a wicket-keeper. He represented Zimbabwe Young Cricketers and Zimbabwe Schools and played one List A cricket match for Zimbabwe A in the 1997/98 Standard Bank Cup. After graduating from the University of Zimbabwe in 1998 and qualifying as a physiotherapist, Robinson worked with the Zimbabwe national cricket team from 2000 to 2004.

In 2005 he left Zimbabwe and moved to England where he worked in private practice in Kent, working with Kent County Cricket Club at the St Lawrence Clinic based at the St Lawrence Ground at Canterbury from 2006. Between 2014 and 2016 he worked with the Pakistan team.
