= Bradley Lord (motorsport) =

British motorsports executive

- Born: 24 May 1980 (age 46); Swindon, United Kingdom
- Citizenship: British
- Occupation: Deputy Team Principal
- Employer: Mercedes-AMG PETRONAS F1 Team
- Known for: Formula One Communications
- Title: Deputy Team Principal

Bradley Lord (born 24 May 1980) is a British Formula One motorsports executive. He is the Deputy Team Principal of Mercedes-AMG Petronas Formula One team.

== Career ==
Lord graduated from the University of Oxford with a degree in English and Modern Languages. He began his motorsports career in the late 1990s as a translator at Renault, working with the company's Formula One operations. He later joined the Benetton Formula team in 2001 as a press officer at the Enstone based outfit, which later became Renault F1. He remained with the team through its transition to Renault, eventually rising to the position of Head of Communications.

After a period working as a journalist for publications including F1 Racing and Autosport between 2007 and 2009, Lord joined Daimler AG in Stuttgart as Communications Manager in 2011. His expertise in Formula One communications led to a reconnection with the Mercedes works team. Since 2013, Lord has played a central role in Mercedes-Benz’s motorsport communications, including Formula One, DTM, and Formula E as the team’s Chief Communications Officer.

In 2023, Lord became Team Representative as he added responsibility for the team’s pioneering sustainability activities and its young driver development programme. In 2026, it was announced that Lord would step up to Deputy Team Principal, working closely with Team Principal & CEO Toto Wolff and the wider executive team.
