= Bradley, Louisville =

Neighborhood in Louisville, Kentucky

Coordinates: 38°12′33″N 85°44′46″W

Bradley is a neighborhood two miles southeast of downtown Louisville, Kentucky, United States, and immediately east of the University of Louisville. The housing stock is mostly brick exterior craftsman style homes. Its boundaries are Eastern Parkway, Preston Highway, the Norfolk Southern Railway tracks, and I-65.

== Demographics ==
As of 2000, the population of Bradley was 1,796, of which 90% was white, 3.3% was black, 6% was listed as other, and 0.6% was Hispanic. College graduates are 24.8% of the population, people without a high school degree are 13.7%, people with 1+ years of college without a degree are 9.3%. Females are 50.1% of the population while males are 49.9%.
