= Bradley D. Smith =

Chemistry and biochemistry professor (born 1961)

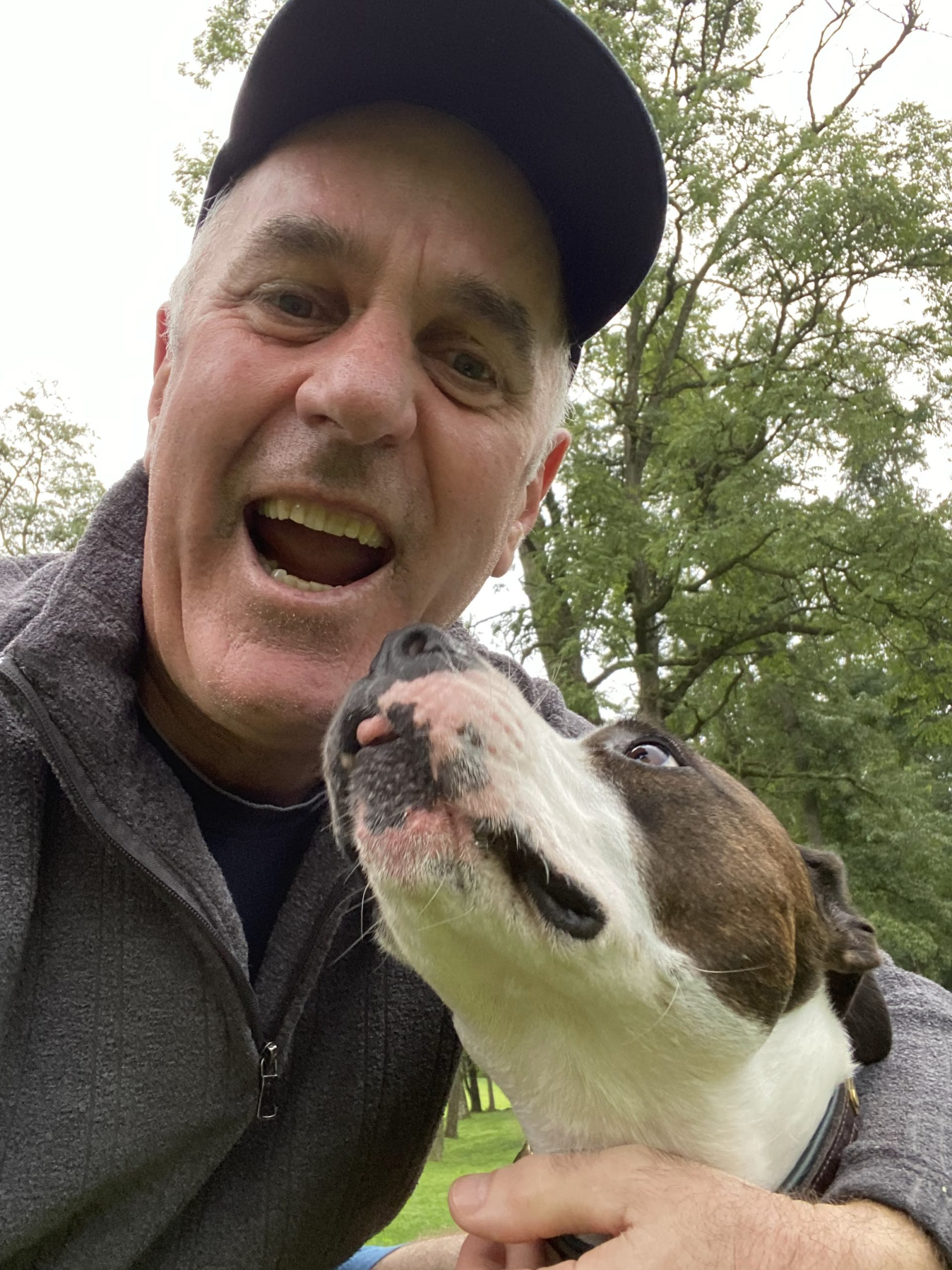
- Born: 1961 (age 64–65); Melbourne, Australia
- Education: University of Melbourne, Pennsylvania State University
- Known for: Squaraine rotaxane dyes, Zn(II)-dipicolylamine probes
- Awards: AAAS Fellow, RSC Fellow
- Scientific career
- Fields: Chemistry, Supramolecular chemistry, Bioorganic chemistry
- Workplaces: University of Notre Dame
- Doctoral advisor: L. M. Jackman

Bradley D. Smith (born 1961) is an Australian-born American chemist and academic known for his work in Supramolecular chemistry and molecular imaging. He is the Emil T. Hofman Professor of Chemistry and Biochemistry at the University of Notre Dame, where he has been on the faculty since 1991, and serves as director of Notre Dame’s Integrated Imaging Facility. Smith’s research focuses on the design of smart molecules for imaging and targeting in biological systems, including the development of fluorescent probes and molecular targeting technologies for detecting cancer, cell death, and microbial infections. He is especially known for squaraine rotaxane dyes and zinc(II)-dipicolylamine targeting agents, and has published extensively in these areas.

== Early life and education ==
Smith was born in 1961 in Melbourne, Australia. He grew up in rural Australia and earned a Bachelor of Science degree with first-class honors from the University of Melbourne in 1983. He then moved to the United States for graduate studies, completing his Ph.D. in chemistry at Pennsylvania State University in 1988. His doctoral research was in the field of organic chemistry under the supervision of Prof. L. M. Jackman. Following his Ph.D., Smith conducted postdoctoral research in supramolecular chemistry at the University of Oxford from 1989 to 1990 (with Prof. Jack E. Baldwin) and at Columbia University from 1990 to 1991 (with Prof. Koji Nakanishi).

== Career ==
In 1991, Smith joined the faculty of the University of Notre Dame as an assistant professor of chemistry and biochemistry. He was promoted to associate professor in 1997 and to full professor in 2001. In 2008, he was appointed as the Emil T. Hofman Professor of Chemistry and Biochemistry, an endowed chair position at Notre Dame, in recognition of his contributions to research and teaching. That same year, Smith became the founding Director of the Notre Dame Integrated Imaging Facility, a campus-wide core facility providing advanced microscopy and imaging instrumentation for researchers in science and engineering.

Throughout his career at Notre Dame, Smith has taught organic chemistry at the undergraduate and graduate levels. He has also held additional appointments, including serving as a senior investigator at the Walther Cancer Research Center (part of Notre Dame’s Harper Cancer Institute) starting in 1999.

Smith has been active in professional service and leadership roles. From 2006 to 2009, he served on the editorial advisory board of the Journal of the American Chemical Society (JACS). In 2014, Smith was appointed associate editor of the ACS journal Bioconjugate Chemistry, a role in which he continues to serve.

== Research ==
Smith worked in supramolecular and bio-organic chemistry, particularly as applied to biological systems. A major theme of Smith’s work is the creation of molecular imaging probes that can detect pathological processes (such as tumors, microbial infections, or cell death) in living organisms. Several of the imaging agents developed by Smith’s group have been commercialized and made available for preclinical research applications.

Smith developed squaraine rotaxanes, a family of mechanically interlocked fluorescent dyes with exceptional performance in the near-infrared (NIR) range. In 2005–2007, Smith and coworkers reported the first squaraine-rotaxane molecules and demonstrated their utility as robust NIR fluorescent probes.

Another area of Smith’s research is the development of zinc(II)-dipicolylamine (Zn-DPA) coordination complexes as targeting agents for anionic membranes. Zn-DPA molecular probes, pioneered by Smith’s lab, selectively bind to negatively charged phospholipid surfaces which are characteristic of certain pathological states.

In addition to these areas, Smith’s research group has made contributions to other facets of supramolecular chemistry, including synthetic anion receptors and membrane transporters, dendritic polymers for drug delivery, and bio-mimetic host–guest systems. Smith has authored over 260 peer-reviewed research articles and holds several U.S. patents on molecular probes.

== Awards and honors ==
- JSPS Visiting Fellow, Japan Society for the Promotion of Science (2008)
- Fellow of the American Association for the Advancement of Science (AAAS) (2010)
- Fellow of the Royal Society of Chemistry (FRSC) (2012)

== Selected publications ==
- Arunkumar, E.; Forbes, C. C.; Noll, B. C.; Smith, B. D. (2005). "Squaraine-derived rotaxanes: sterically protected fluorescent near-IR dyes". Journal of the American Chemical Society. 127 (10): 3288–3289. doi:10.1021/ja0429400
- Johnson, J. R.; Arunkumar, E.; St. Croix, C. M.; Jokerst, J. V.; Panchapakesan, B.; Smith, B. D. (2007). "Squaraine rotaxanes: superior substitutes for Cy-5 in molecular probes for near-infrared fluorescence cell imaging". Angewandte Chemie International Edition. 46 (29): 5528–5531. doi:10.1002/anie.200701491
- Rice, D. R.; Clear, K. J.; Smith, B. D. (2016). "Imaging and therapeutic applications of zinc(II)-dipicolylamine molecular probes for anionic biomembranes". Chemical Communications. 52: 8787–8801. doi:10.1039/C6CC03669D
