= Bradley (surname) =

Family name

- Pronunciation: /ˈbrædli/
- Gender: Male

Origin
- Origin: Old English, Irish
- Meaning: "broad wood", "broad clearing"
- Region of origin: England, Ireland

Bradley is an English surname derived from a placename meaning "broad wood" or "broad meadow" in Old English.

It is also an Anglicisation of the Irish name Ó Brolacháin (also O’Brallaghan) from County Tyrone in Northern Ireland. The family moved and spread to counties Londonderry, Donegal and Cork, and England.

Like many English surnames, Bradley can also be used as a given name.

== Notable people with the surname include ==
- A. C. Bradley (Andrew Cecil Bradley, 1851–1935), English Shakespearean scholar
- A. C. Bradley (screenwriter), an American screenwriter
- Abraham Bradley Jr. (1767–1838), first Assistant Postmaster-General of the U.S.
- Alan Bradley (bowls) (born 1926), Rhodesian international lawn bowler
- Alan Bradley (writer) (1938–2026), Canadian mystery writer
- Allan Bradley, British geneticist
- Amy Lynn Bradley (born 1974), an American woman who disappeared during a Caribbean cruise
- Andrew M. Bradley (1906–1983), American accountant and public official
- Ann Weaver Bradley (1834–1913), American educator, temperance worker and writer
- Archie Bradley (baseball) (born 1992), American baseball player
- Arthur Granville Bradley (1850–1943), English author
- Avery Bradley (born 1990), American basketball player
- Bill Bradley (born 1943), American basketball player, Rhodes scholar, and former US senator from New Jersey
- Bill Bradley (baseball) (1878–1954), American baseball player and manager
- Bob Bradley (disambiguation), several people
- Boo Bradley (1972–2016), stage name of American professional wrestler Jonathan Rechner, also known as Balls Mahoney
- Brian Bradley (disambiguation), several people
- Bruce Bradley (born 1947), American water polo player
- Carter Bradley (born 2000), American football player
- Celeste Bradley (fl. 2001), American author of romance novels
- Charles Bradley (singer) (1948–2017), American R&B, funk, and soul singer
- Charlotte Bradley (athlete) (born 1952), Mexican runner
- Craig Bradley (born 1963), Australian rules footballer
- Dan Beach Bradley (1804–1873), American Protestant missionary to Siam
- Dana Bradley (died 1981), Canadian murder victim
- Daniel Bradley (politician) (1833–1908), New York politician
- Daniel Joseph Bradley (1928–2010), Irish physicist
- David W. Bradley, computer game designer and programmer
- Ed Bradley (1941–2006), American journalist
- Eduardo Bradley (1887–1951), Argentine aviator
- Eli Bradley (1883–1964), English footballer
- Elizabeth Bradley (disambiguation), several people
- Ella J. Bradley-Hughley (1889–1918), American operatic soprano soloist and choir director.
- Eoin Bradley (born 1983), Irish Gaelic footballer, plays for Derry
- Evelyne Bradley (1925–2013), American judge
- Evalie A. Bradley (born 1954), Anguillian politician
- F. H. Bradley (Francis Herbert Bradley, 1846–1924), British idealist philosopher
- Foghorn Bradley (George H. Bradley, 1855–1900), American baseball umpire
- Frank M. Bradley (Frank Mitchell Bradley), American admiral
- Freddie Bradley (born 1970), American football player
- Gene Bradley (born 1957), American football player
- George Bradley (disambiguation), several people
- Gerald A. Bradley (1927–2005), American businessman and politician
- Gwendolyn Bradley (born 1949), American soprano
- Henry Bradley (disambiguation), several people
- Herbert Bradley (1887–1918), English footballer
- Hunter Bradley (American football) (born 1994), American football player
- Jackie Bradley Jr. (born 1990), American baseball player
- Jaden Bradley (born 2003), American basketball player
- Jaden Bradley (born 2003), American football player
- Ja'Marcus Bradley (born 1996), American football player
- James Bradley (disambiguation), several people
- Jean-Claude Bradley (died 2014), American open science chemist
- Jeb Bradley (Joseph E. Bradley, born 1952), New Hampshire politician
- Jerand Bradley (born 2002), American football player
- Jessica "Jess" Bradley, the protégé/scapegoat of James Stillwell in the comic series The Boys
- Joe Bradley (disambiguation), several people
- John Bradley (disambiguation), several people
- Joseph Bradley (died 1671), English buccaneer
- Joseph P. Bradley (1813–1892), Associate Justice of the United States Supreme Court 1870–1892
- Joshua Bradley (born 1992), English YouTuber
- Kaliane Bradley (born 1988), English writer and editor
- Karen Bradley (born 1970), British politician
- Katie Bradley (born 2001), English footballer
- Keegan Bradley (born 1986), American golfer
- Kepler Bradley (born 1985), Australian rules footballer with Essendon Bombers and Fremantle Dockers
- Lewis R. Bradley (1805–1879), American politician, the second Governor of Nevada
- Lewis Bradley (1889–1918), English rugby union and rugby league footballer who played in the 1900s and 1910s
- Liam Bradley (Gaelic footballer), Irish Gaelic football manager
- Loretta Bradley (born 1933), American psychologist
- Luther Bradley (disambiguation), several people
- Marion Zimmer Bradley (1930–1999), American science fiction author
- Mark Bradley (disambiguation), several people
- Martin Bradley (disambiguation), several people
- Mary Bradley (disambiguation), several people
- Matt Bradley (disambiguation), several people
- Mick Bradley (1947–1972), British blues-rock drummer
- Milton Bradley (disambiguation), several people
- Minnie Lou Bradley (1931–2025), American rancher and cattlewoman
- Nellie H. Bradley (c.1838–1927), American writer of plays and songs in support of the temperance movement
- Nina Bradley (boxer) (born 1987), British boxer
- Omar Bradley (1893–1981), U.S. general
- Paddy Bradley (born 1981), Irish Gaelic footballer, plays for Derry
- Percy Bradley (1887–1967), English footballer
- Peter Bradley (disambiguation), several people
- Provine Bradley (1907–1986), American Negro league baseball player
- Rebecca Bradley (1905–1950), American bandit
- Reginald Bradley (1873–1922), Canadian ice hockey player
- Robert Bradley (disambiguation), several people
- Ruth Bradley Holmes (1924–2021), American linguist, educator, and polyglot
- Ryan Bradley (born 1983), American figure skater
- Scott Bradley (baseball) (born 1960), American baseball player and coach
- Shaun Bradley (born 1997), American football player
- Shawn Bradley (born 1972), retired American basketball player
- Stephen Bradley (disambiguation), several people
- Steve Bradley (1975–2008), American professional wrestler
- Stewart Bradley (born 1983), retired American football player
- Taj Bradley (born 2001), American baseball player
- Tom Bradley (disambiguation), several people named Thomas or Tom
- W. C. Bradley (William Clark Bradley, 1863–1947), American entrepreneur and Coca-Cola chairman
- Will H. Bradley (1868–1962), American Art Nouveau illustrator and artist
- William Bradley (disambiguation), several people
- Wilmot Hyde Bradley (1899–1979), American geologist
- Yasemin Bradley, Turkish female physician specialized as nutritionist and dietitian, also a television presenter and writer

== See also ==
- Bradly
- Bradlee
