= John Bradley =

John Bradley may refer to:

== Entertainment ==
- J. Robert Bradley (1919–2007), American gospel singer
- John Bradley (American actor) (born 1960), American television actor
- John Bradley (English actor) (born 1988), British actor from Game of Thrones

== Sports ==
- Jack Bradley (baseball) (1893–1969), American baseball player
- Jack Bradley (footballer) (1916–2002), English footballer
- John Bradley (Australian footballer) (born 1943), Australian rules footballer for Footscray
- John Bradley (drag racer) (1925–2012), American drag racer and land speed racer
- John Bradley (sprinter) (born 1930), American sprinter, 1951 All-American for the USC Trojans track and field team

== Military ==
- Jack T. Bradley (1918–2000), United States Army Air Forces pilot
- John Bradley (RAF officer) (1888–1982)
- John Bradley (United States Navy) (1923–1994), Navy Cross recipient, WW II, flag raiser Iwo Jima
- John A. Bradley (born c. 1945), United States Air Force lieutenant general
- John Jewsbury Bradley (1869–1948), United States Army officer

== Politics ==
- John Bradley (Australian politician) (1844–1900), Australian politician
- John Courtland Bradley (1887–1964), physician and politician in Ontario, Canada
- John E. Bradley (born 1971), Democratic member of the Illinois House of Representatives
- John J. Bradley (1831–1891), New York politician
- John Bradley (Tennessee politician), Tennessee politician
- John Bradley (Wisconsin politician) (1817–1902), Republican member of the Wisconsin State Assembly

== Other ==
- John Bradley (ironmaster) (1769–1816), English industrialist who set up the Stourbridge Ironworks
- John Bradley (d. 1844) (1785–1844), British artist and drawing-master to the Brontës
- John Bradley (artist) (fl. 1830–1840), British-American artist
- John Bradley (bishop), 16th-century English bishop
- John Bradley (doctor) (1917–2004), Canadian doctor
- John R. Bradley (born 1970), British author and journalist
- John Bradley (historian) (1954–2014), Irish historian

== See also ==
- Jon Bradley (born 1981), American football player
- John Bradley & Co, proprietors of the Stourbridge ironworks
