= Robert Bradley =

Robert, Bob, or Bobby Bradley may refer to:

== Sports ==
- Robert Bradley (rugby union) (1873–1952), English rugby union player
- Bob Bradley (footballer) (1924–1999), Australian rules footballer
- Bob Bradley (born 1958), American soccer coach
- Bob Bradley (wrestler) (born 1958), American wrestler
- Bobby Bradley (pitcher) (born 1980), American baseball player
- Bobby Bradley (first baseman) (born 1996), American baseball player

== Others ==
- J. Robert Bradley (1919–2007), American gospel singer
- Robert Bradley (psychologist) (born 1946), American psychologist
- Robert L. Bradley Jr. (born 1955), American historian
- Rob Bradley (born 1970), American politician in Florida
- Bob Bradley (composer) (born 1974), British musician
- Robert B. Bradley, American university administrator

== Other uses ==
- USS Robert G. Bradley, United States Navy frigate
- Robert Bradley's Blackwater Surprise, American blues group
- Bradley method of natural childbirth, obstetrical procedure developed by Dr. Robert A. Bradley
