= Joseph S. Bradley =

American Army general (1900–1961)

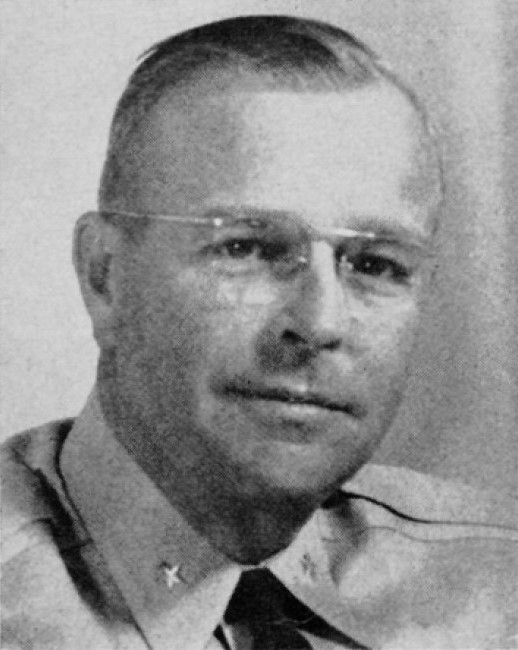
- Bradley as a brigadier general
- Born: 9 June 1900; Vancouver Barracks, Washington, U.S.
- Died: 17 January 1961 (aged 60); Washington, D.C., U.S.
- Military career
- Allegiance: United States
- Branch: United States Army
- Service years: 1918–1956
- Rank: Major General
- Commands: 25th Infantry Division; Marianas–Bonins Command; 126th Infantry, 32nd Infantry Division; 127th Infantry, 32nd Infantry Division
- Conflicts: World War I; World War II; Korean War
- Awards: Distinguished Service Cross (2); Distinguished Service Medal (2); Silver Star Medal (4); Bronze Star Medal (2); Air Medal

Joseph Sladen Bradley (9 June 1900 – 17 January 1961) was a United States Army major general. During World War II, he earned the Distinguished Service Cross for his actions as chief of staff of the 32nd Infantry Division during the battle for New Guinea in December 1942. During the Korean War, Bradley earned a second Distinguished Service Cross for his actions as assistant commander of the 2nd Infantry Division during the battle of Yongsan in September 1950.

== Early life and education ==
Bradley was born at Vancouver Barracks, Washington, the son of John J. Bradley, an 1891 graduate of the United States Military Academy. He was appointed to the U.S. Military Academy Class of 1921 from South Dakota but listed his hometown as Washington, D.C. Bradley enrolled at West Point in June 1917 and was commissioned as an infantry officer on 1 November 1918 because of World War I. After the Armistice, he returned to West Point in December 1918, graduating in June 1919. Bradley graduated from the Infantry School Basic Course in June 1920 and the Command and General Staff School in June 1937. From September 1925 to August 1926, he attended the Massachusetts Institute of Technology, where his training included construction and excavation principles.

== Military career ==
From July to September 1919, Bradley visited the battlefields of Belgium, France and Italy, as well as Army of Occupation bases in Germany. From July to August 1920, he briefly served with the 44th Infantry at the Presidio of San Francisco. Bradley then served with the 31st Infantry in the Philippines from September 1920 to July 1922. He next served with the 15th Infantry at Tientsin, China from July 1922 to January 1924. From July 1924 to July 1925, Bradley served with the 23rd Infantry at Fort Sam Houston, Texas.

Bradley taught drawing at West Point from August 1926 to June 1930. He also served as assistant provost marshal there from September 1929 to August 1930. Bradley then served with the 5th Infantry at Vancouver Barracks, Washington and was adjutant of the 23rd Brigade until May 1933. He was next sent back to the Philippines, where he was an aide-de-camp to Brigadier General Stanley H. Ford and adjutant of the 23rd Brigade in Manila from June 1933 to May 1935. Bradley was adjutant of the 1st Brigade at Fort Wadsworth, New York from July 1935 to August 1936. He was promoted to captain in August 1935.

From June 1937 to October 1938, Bradley was again an aide-de-camp to Stanley H. Ford, by now a major general, at Fort Omaha, Nebraska. He then joined the 3rd Infantry, serving as a company commander at Fort Snelling, Minnesota until November 1939 and then plans and training officer at Camp Jackson, South Carolina and S-3 back at Fort Snelling until September 1940. He was promoted to major in July 1940. Bradley served as an instructor at the Infantry School at Fort Benning, Georgia from September 1940 to April 1942 and received a temporary promotion to lieutenant colonel in September 1941.

During the battle for New Guinea, Bradley served as G-3, G-4, and chief of staff with the 32nd Infantry Division. He received a temporary promotion to colonel in November 1942 and permanent promotion to lieutenant colonel in December 1942. Bradley was briefly given command of the 127th Infantry Regiment in February 1943 before assuming command of the 126th Infantry until March 1944, when he was transferred back to the United States. Bradley then served in staff assignments for the Army and War Department in Washington, D.C. until September 1946. He received a temporary promotion to brigadier general in September 1944. In addition to the Distinguished Service Cross, Bradley received the Distinguished Service Medal, two Silver Star Medals and a Bronze Star Medal for his World War II service. He was also made an honorary commander of the Order of the British Empire.

In September 1946, Bradley was reassigned to the Pacific region, serving as commander of the Marianas–Bonins Command (MARBO) until August 1948. His permanent rank was increased to colonel in March 1948. He then became assistant commandant of the Infantry School at Fort Benning in October 1948.

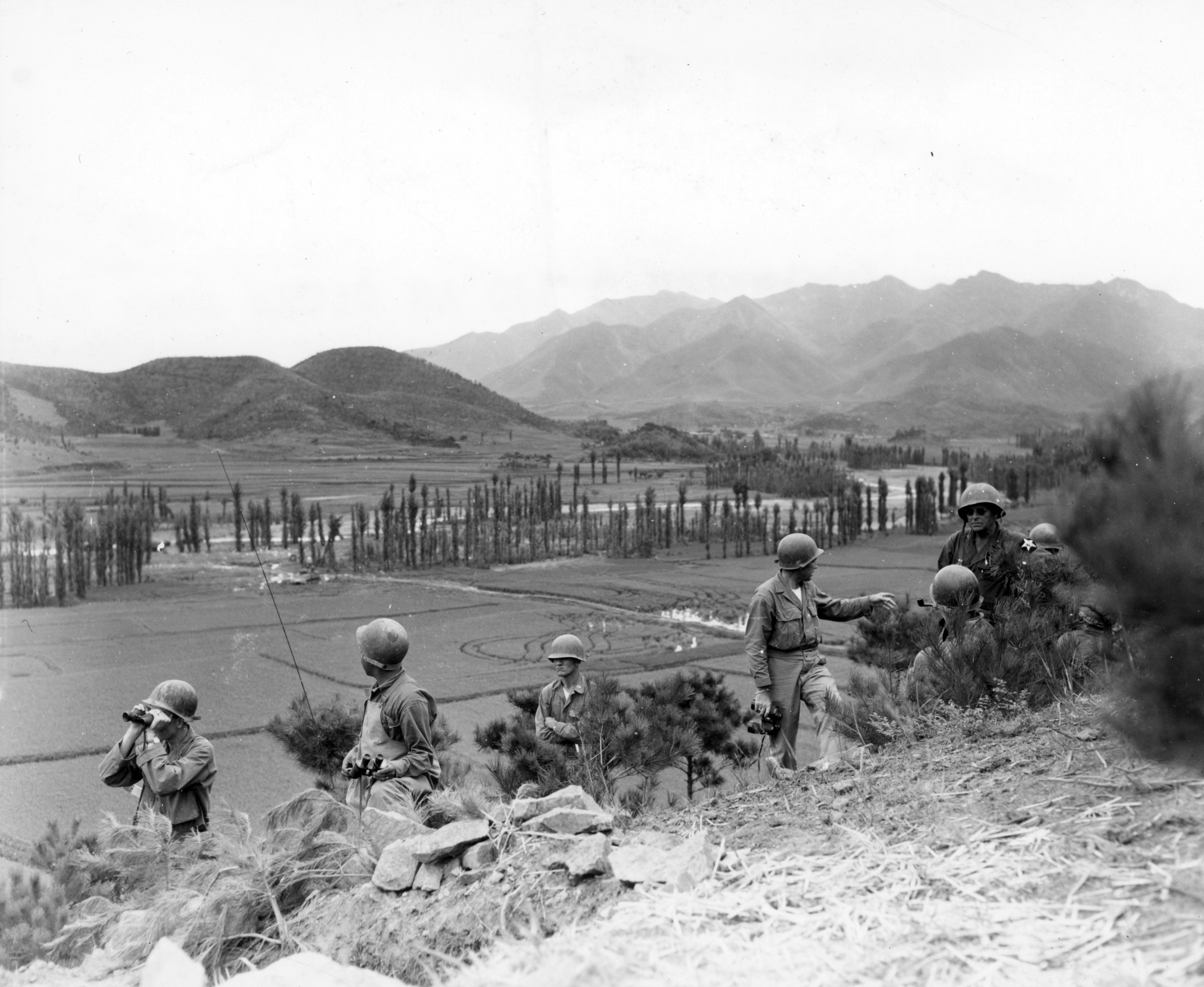
Brigadier General Joseph S. Bradley and his staff observing the attack on Hill 201 by the 9th Infantry, 2nd Division, September, 1950.

After the June 1950 outbreak of hostilities in Korea, Bradley became assistant commander of the 2nd Infantry Division there in August 1950. In February 1951, he assumed command of the 25th Infantry Division from Major General William B. Kean. His own temporary promotion to major general was approved in June 1951. Bradley contracted hepatitis and relinquished command to Major General Ira P. Swift in July 1951. In addition to the Distinguished Service Cross, he received a second Distinguished Service Medal, two more Silver Stars, another Bronze Star and the Air Medal for his Korean War service.

Returning to the United States, Bradley served as deputy director for Strategic Planning, Office of the Joint Chiefs of Staff at the Pentagon from August 1951 to August 1952. His permanent rank was increased to brigadier general in July 1952. He then became chief of the Military Assistance Division at Headquarters, European Command. His promotion to major general was made permanent in January 1954. In February 1955, Bradley was chosen to be military advisor to Dr. James B. Conant, who President Dwight D. Eisenhower had nominated to be the first United States ambassador to West Germany. In this position, he provided guidance on the incorporation of West German military forces into NATO. Bradley retired from active duty on 31 May 1956.

== Family and later life ==
Bradley's parents were John Jewsbury Bradley and Caroline Louise (Sladen) Bradley. His grandfather was Medal of Honor recipient Joseph A. Sladen and his uncle was Fred W. Sladen, an 1890 West Point graduate.

On 25 October 1922 in Tientsin, China, Sladen married Susan Lane Shattuck (27 September 1898 – 25 December 1981), the daughter of Amos Blanchard Shattuck Jr. (11 August 1860 – 22 December 1913), an 1886 West Point graduate. Her grandfather was Milton Cogswell, an 1849 West Point graduate. Bradley and his wife had a daughter and a son.

After his retirement, Bradley and his wife moved to Winter Park, Florida. He died at the Walter Reed General Hospital in Washington, D.C. and was buried at the West Point Cemetery four days later.
