= Lucie Campbell =

American composer (1885–1963)

Lucie Eddie Campbell
- Born: April 30, 1885; Duck Hill, Mississippi
- Died: January 3, 1963 (aged 77); Nashville, Tennessee
- Burial place: Mount Carmel Cemetery (Memphis)
- Occupations: Composer; Music Director; Educator; Social Activist

Lucie Eddie Campbell (born Lucie Eddie Campbell-Williams; April 30, 1885 – January 3, 1963) was an American composer and director of gospel music. She was also an educator and advocate for social justice. She consistently innovated in the conventions of gospel songs and hymns; her 1919 "Something within" is considered the first published gospel song by an African-American.

== Life and career ==
=== Early life and education ===
Lucie Eddie Campbell, the youngest of eleven children, was born to Burrell and Isabella (Wilkerson) Campbell in Duck Hill, Mississippi, US on April 30, 1885. Her father worked for the Mississippi Central Railroad (later purchased by the Illinois Central Railroad), and she was born in the caboose of a train. Isabella worked as a cook and both parents were former slaves. Less than two years after Lucie's birth, Burrell was killed in a train accident; Isabella moved the family to Memphis, Tennessee.

Isabella Campbell could not afford piano lessons for all her children so she elected to give piano lessons to Lora, Lucie's older sister. Lucie listened attentively during these and practiced the lessons on her own. Ethnomusicologist Luvenia A. George remarked that "this determination to learn to play the piano against all odds was an early example of the dogged spirit she displayed her entire life in meeting the goals she set for herself".

Campbell was educated in the public schools of Memphis. In 1899, she graduated from Kortrecht High School as valedictorian of her class. Soon after graduation, at age fourteen, she began teaching at her the at Carnes Grammar School. She gained a second concurrent teaching post at her alma mater, the Kortrecht High School (later renamed the Booker T. Washington High School); she would teach there for the next 44 years. She earned the Bachelor of arts from Rust College in Holly Springs, Mississippi in 1927, and much later a Master of Science in 1951 from Tennessee State University (then known as Tennessee Agricultural and Industrial State College).

=== Career as an educator, evangelist, songwriter and activist ===
At age nineteen, Campbell organized a group of Beale Street musicians into the Music Club. Other members were later added to form a thousand-voice choir that performed at the National Baptist Convention. At the organizational meeting of the National Sunday and Baptist Training Union Congress held in Memphis in 1915, "Miss Lucie" was elected as music director. She penned songs for the Congress and wrote musical pageants exhorting the young to give their lives to Christian service. In addition to writing religious music for the Congress, she also wrote the Congress' study lessons, as well as other instructional materials. Campbell could be found singing and preaching at revival meeting in local Baptist churches that welcomed her.

In 1919, Campbell published her first song, "Something Within", which was followed by more than one hundred others, including "The Lord is My Shepherd", "Heavenly Sunshine", "The King's Highway", "Touch Me Lord Jesus", "He Understands" and "He'll Say Well Done". The core of "He'll Say Well Done", written in 1933, was covered as "End of My Journey" by various artists over the decades, including The Rebels with Jim Hamill, Hank Snow, Johnny Cash, The Famous Davis Sisters of Philadelphia, Delores "Mom" Winans, Ferlin Husky, the duet of Donald Vails and Debbie Steele Hayden, and Ernest Tubb, among many others.

Campbell also introduced promising young musicians such as Marian Anderson and J. Robert Bradley to the world. "Miss Lucie" introduced Anderson to the National Baptist Convention and served as her accompanist. In 1955, Campbell's loyalty and dedication to the Baptist Sunday School and Baptist Training Union Congress was recognized when she was named as one of the principal lecturers during the 50th Anniversary Session held in Atlantic City, New Jersey.

In 1946, she was named to the National Policy Planning Commission of the National Education Association. She was the first woman of any race to serve on the federal grand jury in Memphis, Tennessee. She was elected vice president of the American Teachers Association and from 1941 to 1946 she served as president of the Tennessee Teachers Association. She was also the music director of the National Baptist Convention's Sunday School and the Union Congress of the Baptist Young People.

Campbell was an activist for civil justice. She defied the Jim Crow streetcar laws when she refused to relinquish her seat in the section reserved for whites, and as president of the Negro Education Association, she struggled with governmental officials to redress the inequities in the pay scale and other benefits for Negro teachers.

=== Marriage and death ===
On January 14, 1960, Campbell married her lifelong companion, the Reverend C. R. Williams. The marriage ceremony took place in the home of Mr. and Mrs. Zack Brown in Memphis. As an expression of her love and respect for her friend, business partner, and companion, Campbell-Williams dedicated her song, "They That Wait Upon the Lord", to her husband.

The National Sunday School and the Baptist Training Union Congress of the National Baptist Convention showed its appreciation to its "first lady of music" when it declared June 20, 1962, as Lucie E. Campbell Appreciation Day. While preparing to attend the celebration and banquet held in her honor, Campbell-Williams suddenly became gravely ill and was rushed to a hospital.

After a six-month bout with illness, Campbell-Williams died on January 3, 1963, in Nashville. Her body was conveyed to Memphis and funeral services were held on January 7 at the Mount Nebo Baptist Church by pastor Dr. Roy Love. She was interred in the Mount Carmel Cemetery.

== Sources ==
- Boyer, Horace Clarence (2014) [2013]. "Campbell, Lucie (Eddie)". Grove Music Online. Revised by Roxanne R. Reed. Oxford: Oxford University Press. doi:10.1093/gmo/9781561592630.article.A2256308.
- Darden, Robert (1996). People Get Ready: A New History of Black Gospel Music. New York: Continuum International Publishing Group. ISBN 0826417523.
- George, Luvenia A.; Gilkey, Ada (1987). "Lucie E. Campbell: Baptist Composer and Educator". The Black Perspective in Music. 15 (1): 24–49. doi:10.2307/1215111. JSTOR 1215111.
- George, Luvenia A. (1994). "Campbell, Lucie E. (1885–1963)". Black Women in America: An Historical Encyclopedia. Vol. 1. Bloomington: Indiana University Press. p. 217. ISBN 0-253-32774-1.
- Tennessee Encyclopedia
- Gather.com
