= George Bradley (disambiguation) =

George Bradley (1852–1931) was an American baseball player.

George Bradley may also refer to:

- Foghorn Bradley (George H. Bradley, 1855–1900), American baseball umpire
- George Bradley (cricketer) (1850–1887), English cricketer
- George Bradley (journalist) (1816–1863), English journalist
- George Bradley (Medal of Honor) (1881–1942), U.S. Navy officer
- George Bradley (Minnesota politician) (1833–1879), Minnesota politician
- George Bradley (outfielder) (1914–1982), American baseball player
- George Bradley (poet) (born 1953), American poet
- George Granville Bradley (1821–1903), scholar, schoolteacher, Dean of Westminster, and Master of University College, Oxford
- George Bradley (rugby league) (1889–?), New Zealand rugby league footballer
- George B. Bradley (1825–1916), New York politician and Supreme Court justice

== See also ==
- USS George H. Bradley, a United States Navy patrol vessel and minesweeper
- Brad Hogg (George Bradley Hogg, born 1971), Australian cricketer
