= Senator Bradley (disambiguation) =

Bill Bradley (born 1943) was a U.S. Senator from New Jersey. Senator Bradley may also refer to:

== Members of the United States Senate ==
- Stephen R. Bradley (1754–1830), U.S. Senator from Vermont in the early 1800s
- William O'Connell Bradley (1847–1914), U.S. Senator from Kentucky

== United States state senate members ==
- Daniel Bradley (politician) (1833–1908), New York State Senate
- David Bradley (politician) (born 1952), Arizona State Senate
- Dennis Bradley (born 1983), Connecticut State Senate
- Edward Bradley (politician) (1808–1847), Michigan State Senate
- George B. Bradley (1825–1916), New York State Senate
- Henry Roswell Bradley (1832–1870), Connecticut State Senate
- James A. Bradley (1830–1921), New Jersey State Senate
- Jeb Bradley (born 1952), New Hampshire State Senate
- Jennifer Bradley (born 1970), Florida State Senate
- John J. Bradley (1831–1891), New York State Senate
- Nathan B. Bradley (1831–1906), Michigan State Senate
- Rob Bradley (born 1970), Florida State Senate
- W. E. Bradley (1923–2010), Alaska State Senate
- Walter Dwight Bradley (born 1946), New Mexico State Senate
- William J. Bradley (1852–1916), New Jersey State Senate
