= List of people from San Marcos, Texas =

This is a list of people from San Marcos, Texas in the United States.

== Native residents ==
The following notable people were born in San Marcos. Some became notable after moving away.

- Jim Brown (1892–1943), professional baseball player
- Pete Compton (1889–1978), professional baseball player
- Bill Clowers (1898–1978), professional baseball player
- Ty Detmer, Heisman-winning quarterback from Brigham Young University
- Eddie Durham, jazz guitarist and early electric guitar innovator
- David Hamilton (born 1997), professional baseball player
- Tex Hughson (1916–1993), professional baseball player and father of Jane Hughson, mayor of San Marcos
- George Johnson (1890–1940), professional baseball player
- Donnie Joseph (born 1987), professional baseball player
- Catalina Vasquez Villalpando, 39th Treasurer of the United States
- Tino Villanueva, poet and writer

== Residents ==
These people are or were well known for living in San Marcos. They are either non-native, or a birthplace has not yet been confirmed.

- Charles Austin, Olympic gold medalist
- Powers Boothe, Emmy Award-winning actor
- Ryan Delahoussaye, popular musician and member of the band Blue October
- Tom Ford, film director and fashion designer
- Jeremy Furstenfeld, popular musician and member of the band Blue October
- Justin Furstenfeld, popular musician and member of the band Blue October
- Aaryn Gries, contestant on Big Brother 15
- Heloise (Poncé Kiah Marchelle Heloise Cruse Evans), writer, author, speaker, and syndicated columnist
- C.B. Hudson, popular musician and member of the band Blue October
- Lyndon B. Johnson, thirty-sixth President of the United States, educated at Texas State University–San Marcos
- Tom Martin, Mayor of Lubbock
- Matt Noveskey, popular musician and member of the band Blue October
- Tomás Rivera, influential figure in Chicano and American literature; Texas State University–San Marcos alumni
- John Sharp, former Texas Comptroller
- George Strait, Grammy Award-winning musician

== People associated with San Marcos ==
- Rebecca Bradley (bandit), robbed a Buda bank in 1926, was imprisoned in San Marcos and became known as the "Flapper bandit"
