= Steven Bradbury (disambiguation) =

Steven Bradbury (born 1973) is an Australian short track speed skater.

Steven or Stephen Bradbury may also refer to:

- Steven G. Bradbury (born 1958), American lawyer
- Stephen Bradbury (artist) (born 1954), British illustrator and painter

== See also ==
- Stephen Bradley (disambiguation)
