= Harry Bradley =

Harry Bradley may refer to:

- Harry Bentley Bradley (1939–2023), American car designer
- Harry C. Bradley (painter), American pin-up painter
- Harry C. Bradley (actor) (1869–1947), American actor
- Harry Lynde Bradley (1885–1965), co-founder of the Lynde & Harry Bradley Foundation
- Harry Oliver Bradley (1929–1990), Canadian teacher and politician
- Harry Bradley (musician) (born 1974), Irish flute player

== See also ==
- Lynde & Harry Bradley Foundation
- Lynde & Harry Bradley Technology and Trade School, Milwaukee, Wisconsin, United States
- Henry Bradley (disambiguation)
- Harold Bradley (disambiguation)
