= Bradly =

Bradly is both a given name and surname. Notable people with the name include:

== Given name ==
- Bradly Banks (born 1952), American politician
- Bradly van Hoeven (born 2000), Dutch footballer
- Bradly Knipe (born 1998), New Zealand cyclist
- Bradly Nadeau (born 2005), Canadian ice hockey player
- Bradly Sinden (born 1998), British Taekwondo athlete

== Surname ==
- Graeme Bradly (born 1946), Australian rules footballer
- Mark Bradly (born 1977), Australian rules footballer

== See also ==
- Bradley
- Bradlee
