= Harold Bradley =

Harold Bradley may refer to:

== Others ==
- Harold Bradley (guitarist) (1926–2019), American country and pop guitarist
- Harold Bradley (pianist) (1906–1984), Canadian pianist
- Harold Bradley (trade unionist) (1895–1979), British trade union leader
- Harold C. Bradley (1878–1976), professor in biochemistry at the University of Wisconsin

== Sports ==
- Harold Bradley (basketball) (1911–1985), American college basketball coach
- Harold Bradley Sr. (1905–1973), American football player
- Harold Bradley Jr. (1929–2021), American football player and Italian actor

== See also ==
- Harry Bradley (disambiguation)
