= Elizabeth Bradley (disambiguation) =

Elizabeth Bradley (1922–2000) was an English actress.

Elizabeth Bradley may also refer to:

- Elizabeth Bradley (drama professor) (born 1955), Canadian theatre academic, chair of drama at New York University
- Elizabeth Bradley (mathematician and rower) (born 1961), professor at University of Colorado and competitor in 1988 Olympics
- Elizabeth H. Bradley (born 1962), American political scientist and president of Vassar College
