= Joe Bradley =

Joe or Joseph Bradley may refer to:

== Politicians ==
- Jeb Bradley (Joseph E. Bradley, born 1952), Republican member of the United States House of Representatives for New Hampshire
- Joseph P. Bradley Jr. (1926–1994), Pennsylvania politician

== Others ==
- Joe Bradley (basketball) (1928–1987), American basketball player
- Joe Bradley (artist) (born 1975), American painter
- Joseph P. Bradley (1813–1892), American jurist on the United States Supreme Court
- Joseph S. Bradley (1900–1961), American Army major general
- Joseph Bradley (buccaneer) (fl. 1670), English buccaneer

== Characters ==
- The character played by Gregory Peck in the 1953 film Roman Holiday
- The character played by Tom Conti in the 1987 remake Roman Holiday
- Joe Bradley (90210)

== See also ==
- Bradley Joseph (born 1965), American composer
- Bradley (disambiguation)
