= Henry Bradley (disambiguation) =

Henry Bradley (1845–1923) was a British philologist and editor of the Oxford English Dictionary.

Henry Bradley may also refer to:

- Henry Bradley (MP), in 1421 MP for Old Sarum
- Henry Roswell Bradley (1832–1870), American politician
- Henry Houghton Burton Bradley (1845–1918), Australian arachnologist
- Henry D. Bradley (1893–1973), American newspaper publisher
- Henry Bradley (American football) (born 1953), American football defensive tackle

== See also ==
- Henry Bradley Plant (1819–1899), Florida railroad investor
- Harry Bradley (disambiguation)
