= Bradley James (disambiguation) =

Bradley James (born 1983/1984) is an English actor.

Bradley James may also refer to:

- Bradley S. James, United States Marine Corps general
- Brad James (born 1978), American actor
- Bradley James, British songwriter who wrote song "Something Outa Nothing" for EastEnders

== See also ==
- Dez Fafara (Bradley James Fafara), American vocalist
- James Bradley (disambiguation)
