= James Bradley (disambiguation) =

James Bradley (1693–1762), was an English astronomer.

James Bradley may also refer to:

== Entertainment ==
- James Bradley (American author) (1954–2026), American historical nonfiction author
- James Bradley (Australian writer) (born 1967), Australian novelist and critic
- James Bradley Jr., professional drummer and member of Crazy Town
- Jim Bradley, a character in 1,000 Dollars a Minute
- Doctor Nemesis, an American comic book character called James Bradley

== Sports ==
- James Bradley (footballer) (1881–1954), English footballer
- James Bradley (cricketer) (1913–2001), English cricketer
- James Bradley (basketball) (1955–2023), American basketball player
- Jim Bradley (athletics coach) (1921–2015), Scottish athletics coach
- Jim Bradley (basketball) (1952–1982), American basketball player
- Jim Bradley (American football) (1932–2015), American football coach
- Jimmy Bradley (1927–2008), Scottish footballer

== Other ==
- James Bradley (politician) (1914–1997), Michigan state legislator
- James A. Bradley (1830–1921), developer of Asbury Park and Ocean Grove, New Jersey
- James B. Bradley (1858–1940), Michigan auditor general
- James Chester Bradley (1884–1975), American entomologist
- James L. Bradley (1891−1957), United States Army officer
- James Opelton Bradley (born 1962), American serial killer
- Jim Bradley (journalist) (1904–1991), British journalist and trade unionist
- Jim Bradley (British Army officer) (1911–2003), British POW
- James Bradley (former slave) (c. 1810—after 1837), participated in famous debates on slavery
- Jim Bradley (politician) (1945–2025), Canadian politician
- Jim Bradley (trade unionist) (1867–1929), general secretary of the Fireman's Trade Union (now Fire Brigades Union)

== See also ==
- Bradley James (disambiguation)
