= Bill Bradley (disambiguation) =

Bill Bradley (born 1943) is an American retired politician and NBA basketball player.

Bill Bradley may also refer to:

- Bill Bradley (basketball, born 1941) (1941–2002), American Basketball Association player
- Bill Bradley (American football) (born 1947), American football player
- Bill Bradley (baseball) (1878–1954), American baseball player
- Bill Bradley (cricketer) (1875–1944), English cricketer
- Bill Bradley (cyclist) (1933–1997), English cyclist
- Bill Bradley (1913–1992), member of the Oklahoma House of Representatives also known as W. D. Bradley
- Wilmot Hyde Bradley (1899–1979), also known as Bill Bradley; American geologist

== See also ==
- William Bradley (disambiguation)
