= Eton Latin Grammar =

18th-century Latin grammar schoolbook

- Language: Latin
- Subject: Latin grammar
- Genre: School textbook
- Publisher: Eton College
- Publication date: 18th century (first edition)
- Publication place: United Kingdom
- Media type: Print
- Also known as A Short Introduction to the Latin Tongue, For the Use of Youth

Eton Latin Grammar is a Latin grammar schoolbook associated with Eton College and widely used in British grammar schools during the 18th and 19th centuries.

== History ==
As of the mid-1670s, William Lily's Latin Grammar remained the only latin grammar text officially approved for English schools. In 1732, Dr. John Ward, then Professor of Rhetoric at Gresham College, was commissioned by booksellers with printing rights to revise the flawed text and prepare a corrected edition. To meet evolving educational needs and in response to earlier criticisms, a new version was later developed for students at Eton College, founded in 1440 by Henry VI of England.

When Lily's Latin Grammar was revised in the late 1750s, it was appropriated by Eton College. At the time, Eton had surpassed Westminster School as one of the most prestigious independent schools. Originally titled A Short Introduction to the Latin Tongue, For the Use of Youth, this 1758 edition became known as The Eton Latin Grammar. First printed at Eton by Joseph Pote, an enterprising publisher, in the year 1758. It was also sold by the Eton bookseller Thomas Pote.

Early editions of the text were compiled as a collection of Latin practice exercises adapted to the Latin grammar.

A newly revised eight-volume edition was reprinted in 1790. The words "Eton Latin Grammar" did not appear on a title page until the 1790s, and even then only in works not issued for use at Eton. Nevertheless, it remained widely recognized and influential. Smaller schools adopted it to elevate their reputation, and by 1800, unauthorized copies were circulating across Great Britain. It was the standard Latin textbook for English grammar school pupils in the eighteenth and nineteenth centuries.

In December 1805, Dr. William Fordyce Mavor published a new edition titled The Eton Latin Grammar; or, An Introduction to the Latin Tongue, with explanatory notes collected from various grammarians. He used the Eton Latin Grammar in his school for over twenty years, which gave him detailed insight into its strengths and weaknesses.

T.W.C. Edwards, M.A., became a noted editor of Eton Latin Grammar, releasing his fourth edition by 1828. The dedication in Edward's version was addressed to Rev. John Keate, then headmaster of Eton College.

In an 1856 statement, E. P. Williams identified himself as the publisher of the Eton Grammars (Latin and Greek) and other Eton schoolbooks. He declared some of the "Eton Grammars" advertised in the press were not actually used at Eton. Williams clarified that the only elementary Latin grammar officially used at Eton is published by him, with the sanction of the Eton authorities. It was edited by Charles Duke Yonge and accompanied by Latin exercise books aligned with Eton's rules.

The text was highly regarded in its time, but teachers later dismissed it as outdated, leading to its decline. Its use at Eton continued until the headmastership of Rev. Dr. James John Hornby, appointed in 1868. Following the Public Schools Act 1868 and administrative reforms, it was replaced by Benjamin Hall Kennedy's The Public School Latin Primer.

In 1885, there was renewed interest at Eton in reviving the publication of the Eton Latin Grammar for school use. Intended to meet the needs of boys in the lower forms, the Eton Elementary Latin Grammar aimed to simplify language learning, avoiding complexities and using more straightforward explanations. It was compiled by Arthur Campbell Ainger and H. G. Wintle, assistant masters at Eton College, with the approval of headmaster Rev. Edmond Warre.

Francis Hay Rawlins and William Ralph Inge, assistant headmasters at Eton, edited Eton Latin Grammar in 1888.
