= William Bradley =

William or Will Bradley may refer to:

== Arts and entertainment ==
- William Bradley (painter) (1801–1857), English painter
- Will H. Bradley (1868–1962), American Art Nouveau illustrator and artist
- Will Bradley (1912–1989), American musician

== Law and politics ==
- William C. Bradley (1782–1867), American politician, United States representative from Vermont
- William A. Bradley (1794–1867), American politician, mayor of Washington, D.C.
- William Bradley (New South Wales politician, born 1800) (1800–1868), Australian politician and landholder
- William O'Connell Bradley (1847–1914), American politician, governor of Kentucky and United States senator
- William J. Bradley (1852–1916), American businessman and politician from New Jersey
- William P. Bradley (1867–1938), American lawyer and city councilman in Detroit, Michigan
- William Bradley (New South Wales politician, born 1881) (1881–1957), New South Wales politician

== Sports ==
- William Bradley (footballer) (1893–?), English football (soccer) player
- Will Bradley-King (born 1997), American football player
- William Bradley (boxer) (fl. 1913–1920), South African Olympic boxer

== Others ==
- William Bradley (chef), American Michelin-starred chef
- William Bradley (Royal Navy officer) (1757–1833), British naval officer in the first settlement of New South Wales
- William Bradley (giant) (1787–1820), tallest recorded British man
- William E. Bradley Jr. (1913–2000), American engineer and businessman
- William Lee Bradley (1918–2007), American scholar of comparative religion, ethics, and theology

== See also ==
- Bill Bradley (disambiguation)
