= William Fordyce Mavor =

Scottish teacher, priest and compiler of educational books

William Fordyce Mavor (1 August 1758 – 29 December 1837) was a Scottish teacher, priest and compiler of educational books, many of which passed through numerous editions. He also invented a system of shorthand, which he explained in a treatise entitled 'Universal Stenography’, first published in 1779. He is buried in the church at Woodstock, Oxfordshire, where there is a commemorative plaque.

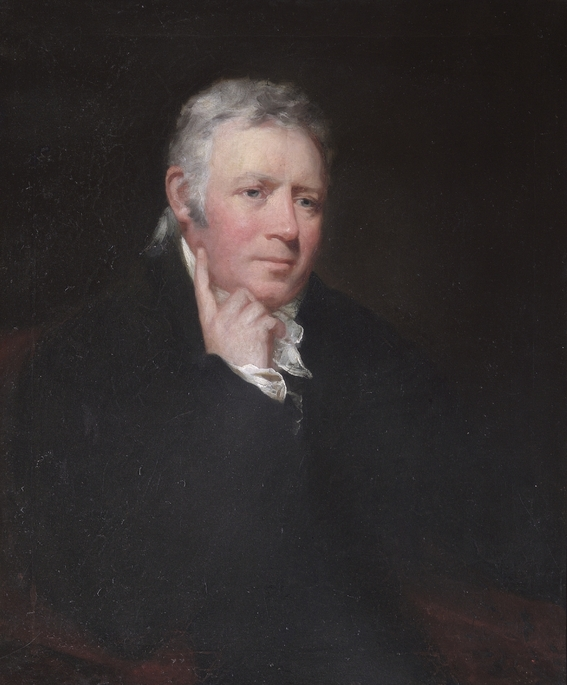
William Fordyce Mavor, portrait by James Saxon

== Life ==
William Fordyce Mavor was born in New Deer, Aberdeenshire, Scotland. In 1775 he became an assistant at a school in Burford, Oxfordshire, and he later taught at Woodstock. After providing writing tuition to the children of George Spencer, 4th Duke of Marlborough, he obtained a title for holy orders in 1781. Eight years later, he obtained the vicarage of Hurley, Berkshire, which he retained until his death, and was awarded an LL.D (Law) degree by University of Aberdeen. Subsequently, thanks to the Duke, he became rector of Stonesfield, Oxfordshire, which he exchanged in 1810 for the rectory of Bladon-with-Woodstock. He became headmaster of Woodstock Grammar School in July 1810.

Mavor was first elected mayor of Woodstock in 1808, and went on to hold mayoral office in the town 10 times.

== Published works ==
Mavor is perhaps best remembered for The English Spelling Book, first published in 1801 and with many later editions. His other writings are:

- The Springs of Parnassus, or Poetic Miscellanies, 1779.
- Poetical Cheltenham Guide, 1781.
- The Geographical Magazine, 2 vols., 1781, published under the name of Martyn.
- Dictionary of Natural History, 2 vols., 1784, issued under the same pseudonym.
- Elegy to the Memory of Captain James King London 1785.
- Blenheim, a poem, to which is added a Blenheim Guide, 1787.
- New Description of Blenheim, 1789 (many subsequent editions). A French version appeared in 1791.
- Vindiciæ Landavenses, or Strictures on the Bishop of Landaff's Charge (addressed to Bishop Richard Watson), 1792.
- Poems, 1793.
- Appendix to the Eton Latin Grammar, 1796.
- The Youth's Miscellany, or a Father's Gift to his Children, 1797 (reprinted in 2 vols. 1805 and 1814).
- Historical Account of the most celebrated Voyages, Travels, and Discoveries from the time of Columbus to the present period, 25 vols. 1798–1802.
- The British Tourists, or Traveller's Pocket Companion through England, Wales, Scotland, and Ireland,’ 6 vols. 1798–1800, a series of tours by various authors. The third edition of 1809 contained a reprint, with alterations and omissions, of Mavor's Tour in Wales in 1805, which had been published anonymously by Sir Richard Phillips in 1806.
- The British Nepos, or … Lives of Illustrious Britons, 1798 (many editions).
- Elements of Natural History, 1799.
- The Young Gentleman's and Lady's Magazine, 2 vols., 1799.
- Natural History, London, 1800 (2nd edit. 1801).
- The Lady's and Gentleman's Botanical Pocket Book, 1800.
- Select Lives of Plutarch, abridged, 1800.
- The Modern Traveller, with illustrative notes, 4 vols., 1800.
- Classical English Poetry for the use of young persons, 1801, edited with Samuel Jackson Pratt.
- The New Speaker, or English Class Book, 1801.
- Universal History, ancient and modern … to the General Peace of 1801, 25 vols., 1802–1804.
- The History of Greece, 2 vols., 1804.
- The History of Rome, 3 vols., 1804.
- The History of England, 2 vols., 1804.
- Proverbs, or the Wisdom of all Nations, 1804.
- Holmes's Art of Rhetoric made easy, 1807.
- A Circle of the Arts and Sciences, 1808.
- The Eton Latin Grammar, with explanatory notes, 1809.
- General View of the Agriculture of Berkshire, London 1809, undertaken for the Board of Agriculture.
- The Mother's Catechism; or first principles of Knowledge, 1809.
- Catechism of General Knowledge, 1809.
- The Catechism of Health, 1809.
- Collection of Catechisms, 2 vols., 1810.
- General Collection of Voyages and Travels, 28 vols., London 1810.
- The Garland: a selection of short poems … a new edition, London 1812.
- Catechism of the Biography of some of the more eminent Britons, London 1820.
- Catechism of the History of Scotland and of Ireland … with an Appendix respecting Wales, London 1820.

Mavor also published a new edition of Anthony Blackwall's Introduction to the Classics, 1809. He abridged Bourgoanne's State of Spain (1812), and edited with notes and a glossary Thomas Tusser's Five Hundred Points of Good Husbandrie (1812). A selection of his works was published as Miscellanies (Oxford, 1829).

== See also ==
- George Bradley - developed a variation of Mavor's shorthand system
