= John Jewsbury Bradley =

United States Army officer and Brigadier general

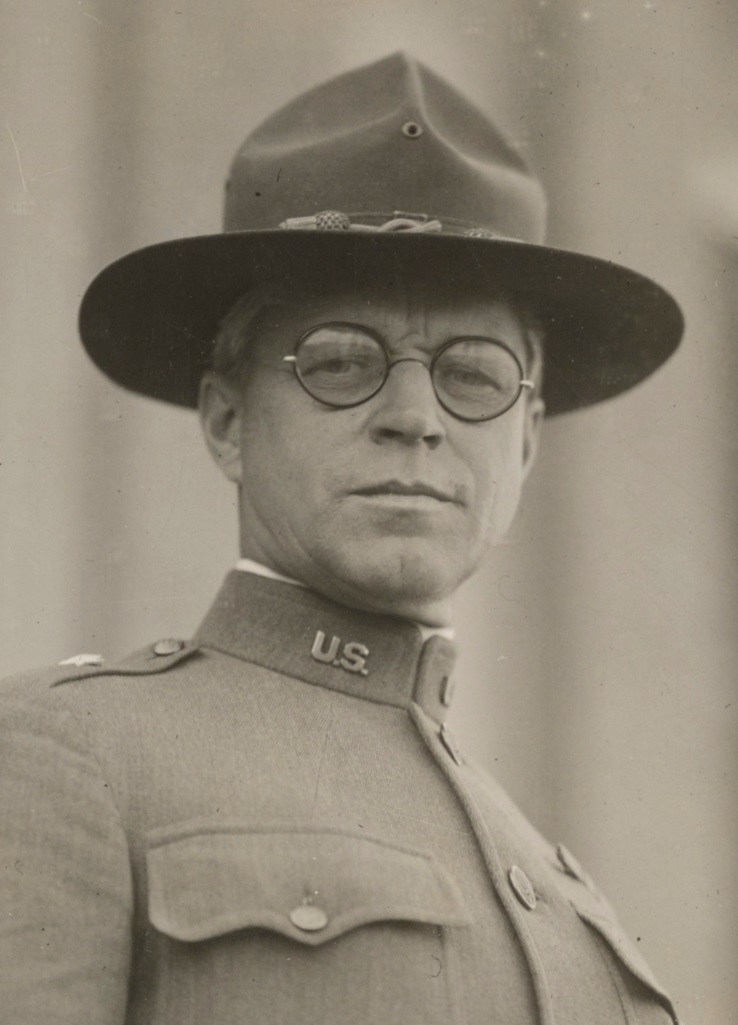
- Bradley in October 1918
- Born: April 20, 1869; Lake View, Illinois, US
- Died: May 21, 1948 (aged 79); Detroit, Michigan, US
- Burial place: West Point Cemetery
- Spouse: Caroline Sladen (m. 1893–1948, his death)
- Children: 3
- Relatives: Fred Winchester Sladen (brother-in-law); Joseph A. Sladen (father-in-law)
- Military career
- Allegiance: United States
- Branch: United States Army
- Service years: 1891–1927
- Rank: Brigadier General
- Unit: Infantry Branch
- Commands: 8th Infantry Division; Hoboken Port of Embarkation; 18th Infantry Regiment
- Conflicts: Philippine–American War; World War I
- Awards: Army Distinguished Service Medal; Silver Star Citation; Purple Heart Medal; Legion of Honour (Officer) (France); Order of St Michael and St George (Companion) (Great Britain); Order of the Crown of Italy (Commander)
- Other work: Attorney

John Jewsbury Bradley (April 20, 1869 – May 21, 1948) was a United States Army officer and a brigadier general who commanded the 8th Infantry Division during World War I.

== Early life ==
Bradley was born in Lake View, Illinois.

He graduated from the United States Military Academy, 53rd in a class of 65, in 1891 and was commissioned in the Fourteenth Infantry. On September 14, 1893, Bradley married Caroline Sladen, daughter of Medal of Honor recipient Joseph A. Sladen and sister of Fred Winchester Sladen. They had three children: Frances Bradley, John J. Bradley Jr., and Joseph S. Bradley.

== Military career ==
Bradley served overseas in the Philippine insurrection, for which he received the Purple Heart Medal and a Silver Star Medal, as well as in China.

In 1912, he graduated from the Army School of Line and in the following year he graduated from the Army Staff College. Bradley served on the War Department General Staff in 1917 and 1918 which earned him a Distinguished Service Medal.

On June 26, 1918, he was promoted to brigadier general. He was sent to France along with the American Expeditionary Forces and commanded a brigade of the 82nd Infantry Division. In November 1918, Bradley commanded the Eighth Infantry Division.

After the war, Bradley was reduced back to his permanent rank of lieutenant colonel in October 1919 and then promoted to colonel in January 1920. He commanded the Hoboken Port of Embarkation from June 1920 to July 1921 and the 18th Infantry Regiment from July 1923 to July 1927.

== Awards ==
Along with his medals from the United States, Bradley would also receive the Officer of the Legion of Honor from France, the Companion of the Order of St Michael and St George from England, and the Commander of the Order of the Crown from Italy.

== Death and legacy ==
Bradley retired as a colonel in 1927 due to disabilities, but went on to practice law in the state of New York. He was advanced to brigadier general on the retired list in 1930. Bradley became a trustee of the Disabled American Veterans Service Foundation. He also belonged to the Military Order of the World Wars, Guards' Club in London, and Army and Navy Club (Washington, D.C.). Bradley died on May 21, 1948, in Detroit, Michigan, at the age of seventy-nine. Bradley and his wife Caroline were buried at the West Point Cemetery.

== Bibliography ==
- Davis, Henry Blaine Jr.. Generals in Khaki. Raleigh, NC: Pentland Press, 1998. ISBN 1571970886 OCLC 231779136
- Marquis Who's Who, Inc. Who Was Who in American History, the Military. Chicago: Marquis Who's Who, 1975. ISBN 0837932017 OCLC 657162692
