= Joseph A. Sladen =

United States Army general

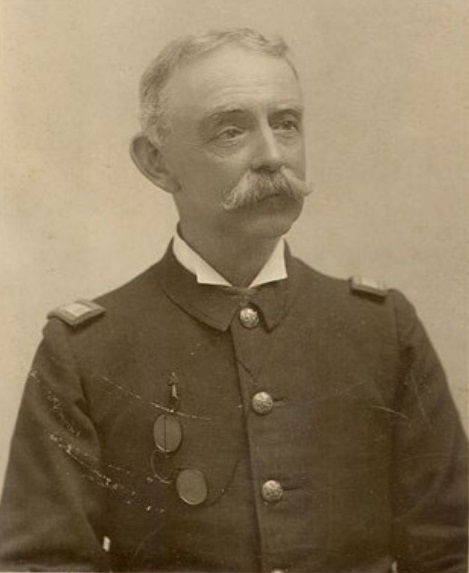
- Born: April 9, 1841; Rochdale, England
- Died: January 25, 1911 (aged 69); Portland, Oregon
- Burial place: West Point Cemetery, West Point, New York
- Alma mater: Howard University College of Medicine; Bellevue Medical College
- Spouse: Martha "Mattie" Frances Winchester (m. 1866-1911, his death)
- Children: 5 (including Fred Winchester Sladen)
- Relatives: John Jewsbury Bradley (son-in-law)
- Military career
- Allegiance: Union; United States of America
- Branch: Union Army (1862-1866); United States Army (1866-1889)
- Service years: 1862–1889
- Rank: Captain (Army); Major (Retired list)
- Unit: United States Army Infantry Branch
- Conflicts: American Civil War; American Indian Wars
- Awards: Medal of Honor
- Other work: Businessman; U.S. Circuit Court Clerk

Joseph A. Sladen was an officer in the United States Army. A Union Army veteran of the American Civil War, he received the Medal of Honor for heroism at the 1864 Battle of Resaca. He continued to serve after the Civil War, and took part in several campaigns of the American Indian Wars. After retiring for disability in 1889, he settled in Portland, Oregon, where he served as clerk of the U.S. Circuit Court. Sladen died in Portland and was buried at West Point Cemetery.

== Early life ==
Joseph Alton Sladen was born in Rochdale, England on April 9, 1841, a son of James and Mary Sladen. James Sladen worked as a coal and lime merchant, and died when Joseph Sladen was five years old. Mary Sladen moved to Lowell, Massachusetts with Joseph so they could join his older siblings who already resided there. Joseph Sladen began working in local mills and factories at age nine, helping support the family while attending the public schools. After completing his education, Sladen worked for two years as a cloth carder.

== Military service ==
=== American Civil War ===
In 1862, Sladen joined the Union Army for the American Civil War, enlisting as a private in Company A, 33rd Massachusetts Infantry Regiment. He took part in several of the regiment's engagements, including the Battle of Chancellorsville and Battle of Gettysburg. Sladen took part in the May 13–15, 1864 Battle of Resaca. While serving as a clerk at the regimental headquarters, Sladen left his post to voluntarily join the battle. His personal example inspired his comrades at a critical moment in the fight, and they rallied to defeat their Confederate opponents. In 1895, he received the Medal of Honor in acknowledgement of his Civil War heroism.

Having received promotion to corporal, in 1864 Sladen was commissioned as a first lieutenant of Volunteers and assigned to the 14th United States Colored Infantry Regiment. Detailed as an aide-de-camp to General Oliver Otis Howard, he remained in the Union Army until 1866. Sladen took part in the September 1864 Battle of Jonesborough, for which he received regular army brevet promotions to first lieutenant and captain.

=== Post-Civil War ===
After the war, Howard was appointed commissioner of the Freedmen's Bureau in Washington, D.C. Sladen was appointed a second lieutenant in the United States Army's 17th Infantry Regiment and detailed to Howard's staff. In 1866, he was transferred to the 26th Infantry Regiment, and in 1870, he was transferred to the 14th Infantry Regiment, but he continued to serve at the Freedman's Bureau. When Howard became president of Howard University, Sladen served as the school's secretary. While serving in Washington, Sladen also attended Howard University College of Medicine, from which he graduated with an M.D. degree in 1871. He then attended Bellevue Medical College in New York City, from which he received an M.D. in 1872. After completing his education, Sladen served on Howard's faculty as an instructor of anatomy.

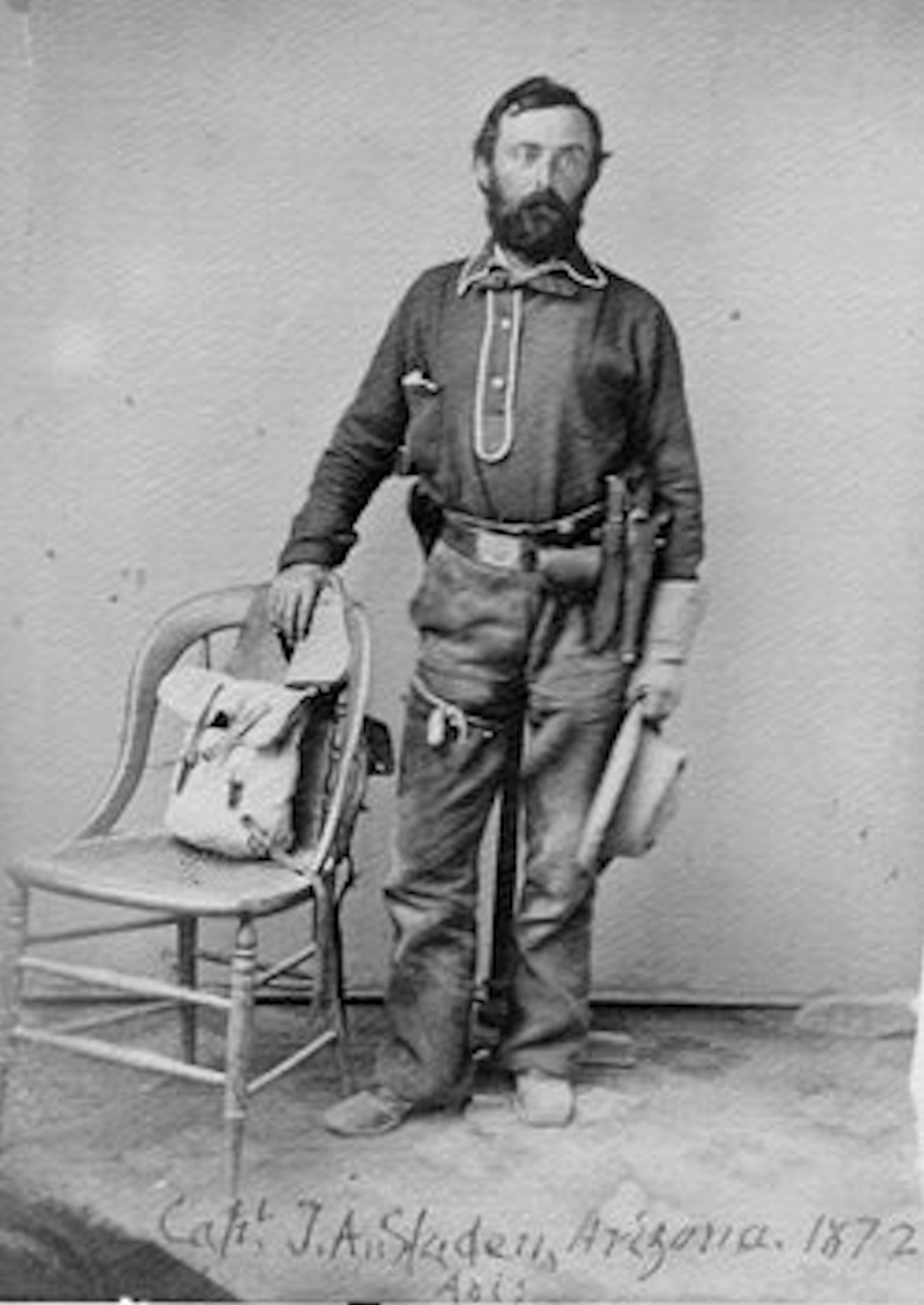
Sladen in 1872

In the summer of 1872, the administration of President Ulysses S. Grant directed Howard to meet with the Chiricahua Apache leader Cochise and attempt to negotiate a settlement to his decade-long guerilla war against American settlers. Sladen accompanied General Howard, a guide, and two Apache scouts on the mission, which took them throughout New Mexico and Arizona as they attempted to locate Cochise and his followers. Sladen kept a journal of the expedition, which was later published as Making Peace With Cochise. Howard and Cochise agreed to a treaty in September 1872.

When Howard was assigned as commander of the Army's Department of the Columbia in 1874, Sladen joined his headquarters staff in Portland, Oregon and served at different times as aide-de-camp, assistant adjutant, adjutant, and acting judge advocate. Sladen remained with the Department of the Columbia until 1881, and took part in the Nez Perce War of 1877 and Bannock War of 1878. On October 12, 1875, Sladen was on a trip to Fort Walla Walla, Washington when he mounted an unfamiliar horse. The horse threw him against a tree, resulting in Sladen breaking his right leg. Gangrene developed, and on October 25 a surgeon amputated Sladen's leg above the ankle. On August 16, 1876, Sladen was a passenger on the Pacific Mail Steamship Company's John L. Stephens when he fell and broke his right leg a second time, this time above the knee, which likely led to an additional amputation.

In 1881, Howard was appointed Superintendent of the United States Military Academy, and Sladen served on his staff as the academy's adjutant. In 1882, Howard University awarded Sladen the honorary degree of Master of Arts. In 1882, Howard was assigned to command the Department of the Platte at Fort Omaha, Nebraska and Sladen was assigned to his headquarters staff. In 1885, Sladen joined the 14th Infantry at Vancouver Barracks, Washington. On June 15, 1888, Sladen was promoted to captain. In April 1889, he retired from the Army as the result of disability caused by the loss of his leg.

=== Medal of Honor citation ===
The President of the United States of America, in the name of Congress, takes pleasure in presenting the Medal of Honor to Private Joseph Alton Sladen, United States Army, for extraordinary heroism on 14 May 1864, while serving with Company A, 33d Massachusetts Infantry, in action at Resaca, Georgia. While detailed as clerk at headquarters, Private Sladen voluntarily engaged in action at a critical moment and his personal example inspired the troops to repel the enemy.

Awarded for Actions During: Civil War Service: Army Division: 33d Massachusetts Infantry Date of Issue: July 19, 1895

== Later life ==
After leaving the military, Sladen settled in Portland, Oregon, where he started a business career. He was general manager of Aetna Life Insurance Company's Portland office and a special agent for the Columbia Fire and Marine Insurance Company. In addition, he served on the board of directors for the Savings Bank of the Northwest Loan and Trust Company. Sladen also served as a special agent for the German American Insurance Company, and also carried out an appointment as professor of military science at Portland's Bishop Scott Academy.

In 1894, Sladen was appointed clerk of the U.S. Circuit Court for the District of Oregon. He held this position until 1908, when he learned he had been promoted to major on the Army's retired list. Long active in Freemasonry, Sladen held several leadership positions in the organization and attained the 33rd degree of the Scottish Rite in 1904. In addition, his civic and professional memberships included Portland's Boys & Girls Aid Society, the Grand Army of the Republic, and the Baptist Church.

== Death and burial ==
In retirement, Sladen continued to reside in Portland. He died there on January 25, 1911. Sladen was originally interred at River View Cemetery in Portland. In 1929, he was reinterred at West Point Cemetery in West Point, New York.

== Family ==
On November 29, 1866, Sladen married Martha "Mattie" Frances Winchester (1842-1929) of Lowell, Massachusetts. They were the parents of three sons and two daughters.

Fred Winchester Sladen (1867-1945) was a career officer in the U.S. Army and attained the rank of major general.
Caroline Louise "Carrie" Sladen (1869-1956) was the wife of John Jewsbury Bradley, a brigadier general in the U.S. Army.
Bessie Howard Sladen (1871-1872)
Harry Stinson Sladen (1874-1953), a Stanford University graduate and electrical engineer.
Frank Joseph Sladen (1882-1973), a graduate of Yale University and Johns Hopkins University, he became a medical doctor and researcher. Dr. Sladen was long associated with the Henry Ford Hospital and Henry Ford Health System.

== Legacy ==
While residing in Portland, Sladen's family resided in a mansion Sladen had constructed. The home, which was designed by the Whidden & Lewis architectural firm, was built on NW Flanders Street. It still stands and is now the location of the Miller & Wagner law firm. The Sladen mansion is one of the buildings that make up the Alphabet Historic District, which was added to the National Register of Historic Places in 2000.
