= Boys & Girls Aid =

- Founded: 1885
- Type: Nonprofit
- Location: Portland, Oregon, United States
- Website: www.boysandgirlsaid.org

Boys & Girls Aid (or Boys & Girls Aid Society of Oregon) is a non-profit organization that provides services to children in crisis in the state of Oregon, United States.

== History ==
Boys & Girls Aid (formally The Boys & Girls Aid Society of Oregon) was founded in Portland, Oregon, in 1885 by a group of community and business leaders concerned with child welfare. This non-profit organization started as an orphanage and is considered by some as a pioneer in applying the foster care model instead of the typical orphanage model. Later on, the services provided by the organization included a wider range of care for children in different age groups. The organization grew into several branches in different parts of the state of Oregon. It is Oregon's oldest child welfare society.

== Mission and goals ==
The organization's mission is to impact the well-being of children in need. This has been its primary goal since 1885. It has also evolved from an agency that takes care of adoption to a wider range of services for children in need that include residential facilities for at-risk populations and foster care. The organization's prospective is to be able to provide help to all children in their service area that require such care.

== Accomplishments ==
Boys & Girls Aid has helped in more than 100,000 children since it was founded. The organization serves infants, children, teens and young adults, 0–23 years old, through infant adopt, foster care adoption, foster care or residential care.

== Services and programs ==
Boys & Girls Aid offers services including adoption, foster care, foster care adoption, and housing and shelter services.

=== Adoption ===
The agency offers adoption services for infants and children, including children in foster care who have mental and physical challenges, or are older, and spent a significant amount of time in the foster care system.

=== Foster care ===
Boys & Girls Aid offers foster care services for older youth under the care of the Oregon Department of Human Services. The program serves both short and long-term foster care needs by placing children under the care of state certified foster homes. Boys & Girls Aid also has requirements for foster parents in addition to state requirements.

=== Shelter and housing ===
The agency offers shelter and housing services for youth 10 to 23 years old. The agency's programs include Safe Place for Homeless and Runaway Youth, located in Washington County, STEP (Stabilization, Transition & Evaluation Program), located in Multnomah County, and the Transitional Living Program, located in Washington County. Each program works with children and young adults who have experienced some form of abuse or neglect in their lifetime.

=== The Permanency Initiative ===
In 2011, Boys & Girls Aid began the Permanency Initiative. The organization committed to a 20-year plan that would shift services toward identifying lifelong connections for all children exiting their services. The plan was implemented in response to a large number of young adults aging out of foster care without the necessary support as they enter adulthood. Boys & Girls Aid designed the Permanency Initiative to offset the high rates of unemployment, incarceration and unplanned pregnancy many foster youth experience compared to their peers. The initiative also focuses on the mental, emotional, social and physical health of youth without a primary caregiver.

== Support and accreditations ==
About 50% of the funding comes from contracts with the cities, counties and the state or federal government. The other half comes from donations and fundraising campaigns. Another source of support is the auxiliaries ran primarily by adoptive parents or any one who wants to support the organization. The organization is part of many health care and social services associations like:

1. The Council on Accreditation for Children and Family Services, Inc.
2. Foster Family Care Network.
3. Child Welfare League of America.
4. Association of Fundraising Professionals.
5. United Way of the Columbia-Willamette.
6. National Association of Social Workers.
