= John Bradley (Australian footballer) =

Australian rules footballer (born 1943)

Personal information
- Full name: John Bradley
- Born: 10 May 1943 (age 83)
- Original team: Wagga Wagga
- Height: 184 cm (6 ft 0 in)
- Weight: 89 kg (196 lb)

Playing career^{1}
Years	Club	Games (Goals)
1963–67	Footscray	43 (12)
- ^{1} Playing statistics correct to the end of 1967.

John Bradley (born 10 May 1943) is a former Australian rules footballer who played with Footscray in the Victorian Football League (VFL).
