= Bradlee =

Bradlee is both a surname and a given name. Notable people with the name include:

== Surname ==
- Antoinette Pinchot Bradlee (1924–2011), American socialite and artist
- Ben Bradlee (1921–2014), American newspaper editor and writer
- Ben Bradlee Jr. (born 1948), American journalist and writer
- Frederick Bradlee (1892–1970), American football player
- Quinn Bradlee (born 1982), American filmmaker, writer, and activist
- Scott Bradlee (born 1981), American musician

== Given name ==
- Bradlee Anae (born 1998), American football player
- Bradlee Ashby (born 1995), New Zealand swimmer
- Bradlee Baladez (born 1991), American soccer player
- Bradlee Farrin (born 1964), American politician
- Bradlee Heckmann, American biologist and neuroimmunologist
- Bradlee Van Pelt (born 1980), American football player

== See also ==
- Bradlees, a defunct American department store chain
- Bradley
- Bradly
