= Mount Carmel Cemetery =

Mount Carmel Cemetery may refer to:

- Mount Carmel Cemetery (Hillside, Illinois), burial site of Chicago's Roman Catholic archbishops and some organized crime figures
- Mount Carmel Cemetery (Wyandotte, Michigan)
- Mount Carmel Cemetery (Queens, New York) is a Jewish cemetery that opened in 1906
- Mount Carmel Cemetery (Memphis)
- Mt. Carmel Cemetery (Lincoln, Nebraska)
- Mt. Carmel Cemetery (Philadelphia)

== See also ==
- Old Mt. Carmel Cemetery, Wrought-Iron Cross Site
