= Brian Bradley (disambiguation) =

Brian Bradley (born 1965) is a retired Canadian ice hockey centre.

Brian Bradley may also refer to:

- Brian Bradley (ice hockey, born 1944), Canadian ice hockey winger
- Stro (Brian Vaughn Bradley Jr., born 1996), American rapper, producer and actor
- Brian Bradley, president of the News-Press & Gazette Company
