= Stephen Bradley =

Stephen Bradley may refer to:

== Sports ==
- Steve Bradley (American football) (born 1963), American football quarterback
- Stephen Bradley (footballer) (born 1984), Irish football player
- Stephen Bradley (equestrian) (born 1962), American international equestrian eventing rider
- Steve Bradley (1975–2008), American wrestler
- Steven Bradley (Scottish footballer) (born 2002), Scottish football player

== Other ==
- Stephen R. Bradley (1754–1830), early American politician
- Stephen Bradley (diplomat) (born 1958), British diplomat
- Stephen Bradley (bishop) (1909–2003), South African bishop
- Stephen Leslie Bradley (c. 1926–1968), Hungarian-Australian kidnapper, murderer of schoolboy Graeme Thorne
- Stephen Bradley (musician) (born 1972), American musician with the band No Doubt
- Stephen Bradley (film director), Irish director, scriptwriter, and producer
- Steve Bradley (politician), American politician in Iowa

== See also ==
- Steven Bradbury (disambiguation)
