= John Bradley (artist) =

American painter

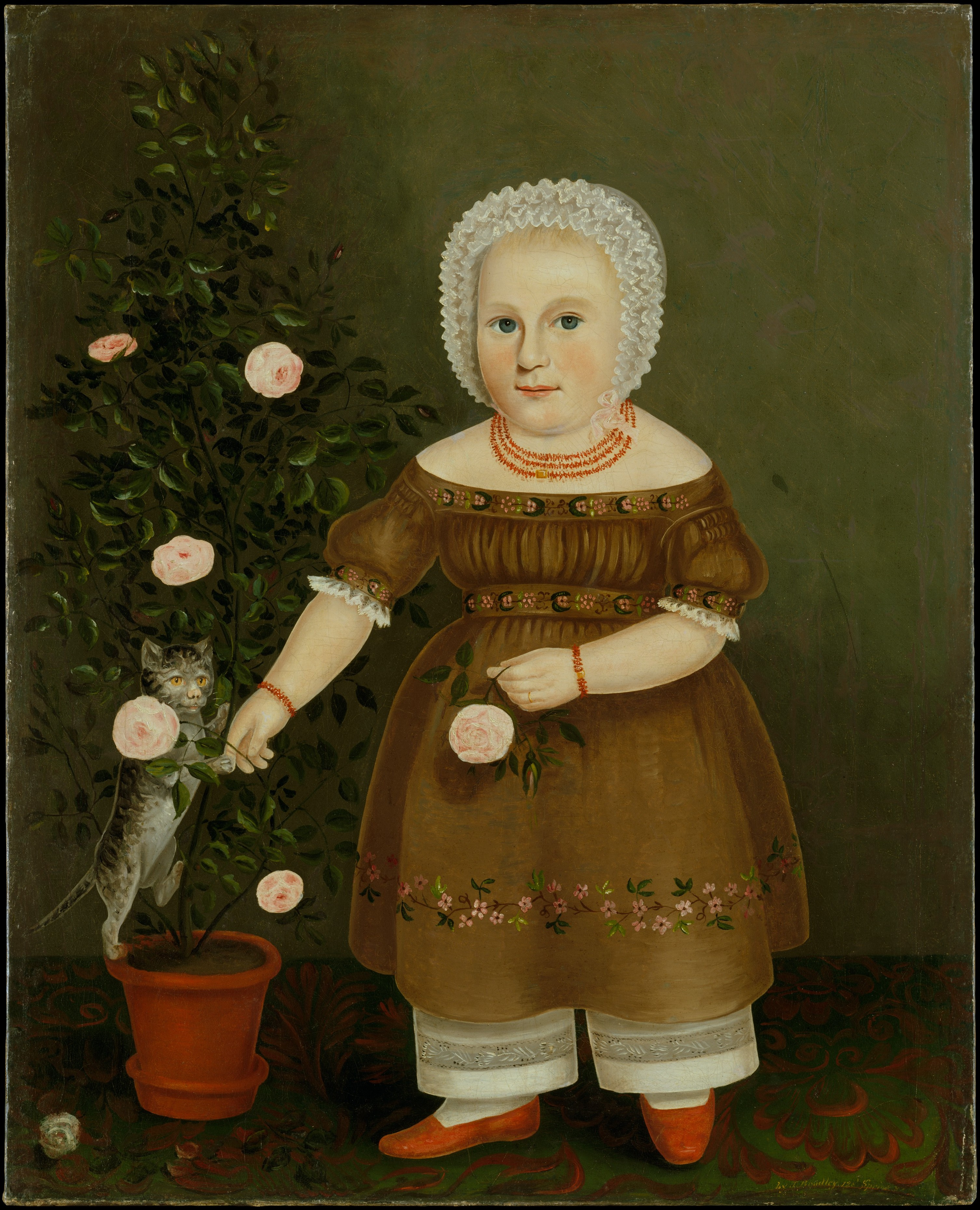
Emma Homan by John Bradley, ca. 1844

John Bradley was a British-born American artist who was active in the New York area in the 1830s and 1840s. He is primarily known for his portrait paintings, which are held in several North American museum collections.

He should not be confused with John Bradley of Keighley, Yorkshire (1787–1844), British artist and drawing-master to the Brontës, or John Bradley of Pall Mall, London (1786–1843), a printmaker and portraitist.

== Career ==
John Bradley's origin is documented through the inscription, "Drawn by I. Bradley from Great Britton", found on the reverse of each of five portraits of Totten family members.

Bradley's birth and death dates have not been discovered, nor is there evidence of any formal education as an artist. The use of distemper as a medium for some of his portraits may suggest that he also worked as a decorative or commercial painter as well as a portraitist.

Possible evidence of the artist's early career expanded with the discovery in 2005 of Painting of a Prize Cow in a Field, signed "Drawn by I Bradley, Honington, Suffolk 1827", as well as a pair of children's portraits, signed "I. Bradley, Limner, Suffolk 1830" that were consigned to Bonhams Ipswich.

The earliest paintings by Bradley in U.S. collections, including The Cellist, painted in 1832, may have been painted in Britain. By the end of 1832, he was evidently working on Staten Island, where he painted Asher Androvette holding a copy of the 29 November 1832 issue of The New York and Richmond County Free Press. A record of someone named John Bradley as a "deranged" resident of Sailors' Snug Harbor, a Staten Island home for retired seamen, may indicate that he had at least one family member in the area.

Listings in the New York City directories for the period 1836 through 1847 show John Bradley as a portrait painter, and sometimes a miniature painter as well, at three different locations near present-day Houston Street in the SoHo neighborhood of Manhattan. From 1836 to 1837 he was at 56 Hammersley Street; from 1837 to 1844 he was 128 Spring Street; and from 1844 to 1847 he was listed at 134 Spring Street. These addresses are inscribed on some of Bradley's paintings and have been used to establish their dates of creation.

There are no known works or any other evidence that John Bradley's career continued after 1847.

== Paintings ==
Among John Bradley's best known works are The Cellist, 1832 (in The Phillips Collection), Little Girl in Lavender, ca. 1840 (in the National Gallery of Art), and portraits of Staten Island residents who were members of the Totten, Cole, and Ellis families, painted in the 1830s (in the Staten Island Historical Society). Emma Homan, a portrait of a young child painted ca. 1844, is in the collection of the Metropolitan Museum of Art.

Bradley is often grouped with naïve, itinerant, or folk artists. His work was carefully composed and richly detailed, and directory listings for New York City indicate he made his living as a professional artist. Many of his portraits have a waist-length format, but those depicting children, or adults with musical instruments, show the full length of subjects who are either seated or standing. Mille Farm, 1835 (in the Staten Island Museum, New York), a Staten Island scene with animals in the foreground, is a rare example of a landscape signed by Bradley.

Depictions of animals appear in a number of Bradley's works. Emma Homan and Little Girl in Lavender feature domestic cats, while farm animals are seen in Mille Farm, as well as the earlier English painting Painting of a Prize Cow in a Field. In Young Boy Feeding Rabbits, 1831 (present location unknown) the animals hold a central place in the composition.

Bradley's portraits have been noted for their extraordinary attention to personal attributes that reveal the characters of his sitters. In addition to children with pets or adult musicians with legible sheet music, other works that feature notable accoutrements are Boy with Sinumbra Lamp (private collection) and John Totten, who is shown with drafting instruments.

Bradley's works often show rich, deep colors, such as reds for draperies and greens for his representations of floor and surface coverings. His children's portraits, in particular, show bold color choices. He often used light outlines to highlight the contours of his subjects, giving an appearance that is clearly delineated rather than finely modeled.

His portraits of John Totten and Ann Cole Totten were stolen from the museum of the Staten Island Historical Society in 1970. John Totten was quickly recovered, but the companion portrait remained missing until turning up at auction in Alameda, California in 2021.

Some paintings that had once been attributed to John Bradley were later identified as the work of Ammi Phillips.
