= Herbert Bradley =

English footballer

Personal information
- Full name: Herbert Bradley
- Date of birth: 1888
- Place of birth: Padiham, England
- Date of death: 21 June 1918 (aged 29–30)
- Place of death: Limburg an der Lahn, Germany
- Position: Outside left

Senior career*
Years	Team	Apps	(Gls)
- Colne
1906–1909	Bury	18	(0)
1910	Notts County	3	(0)
- Padiham
1911	Preston North End	2	(0)
- Great Harwood
- Nelson
- * Club domestic league appearances and goals

Herbert Bradley (1888 – 21 June 1918) was an English professional footballer who played as an outside left in the Football League for Bury, Notts County and Preston North End.

== Personal life ==
Bradley served as a gunner in the Royal Garrison Artillery during the First World War. On 5 April 1918, while acting as a forward artillery observer, he was taken prisoner by German forces and taken to Limburg an der Lahn prisoner of war camp. He died of dysentery in the camp on 21 June 1918 and was buried in Avesnes-sur-Helpe Communal Cemetery, France.

== Career statistics ==
Appearances and goals by club, season and competition
Club	Season	League			National cup (Note: Includes FA Cup)		Total	
Club	Season	Division	Apps	Goals	Apps	Goals	Apps	Goals
Bury	1906–07	First Division	5	0	0	0	5	0
Bury	1907–08	First Division	2	0	0	0	2	0
Bury	1908–09	First Division	2	0	0	0	2	0
Bury	1909–10	First Division	9	0	0	0	9	0
Bury	Total		18	0	0	0	18	0
Notts County	1910–11	First Division	3	0	0	0	3	0
Preston North End	1911–12	First Division	2	0	0	0	2	0
Career total			23	0	0	0	23	0
