= Graeme Bradly =

Australian rules footballer

Personal information
- Full name: Graeme Bradly
- Born: 11 April 1946 (age 80)
- Original team: East Perth
- Height: 192 cm (6 ft 4 in)
- Weight: 77 kg (170 lb)

Playing career^{1}
Years	Club	Games (Goals)
1967	South Melbourne	2 (1)
- ^{1} Playing statistics correct to the end of 1967.

Graeme Bradly (born 11 April 1946) is a former Australian rules footballer who played with South Melbourne in the Victorian Football League (VFL).
