= Nellie H. Bradley =

American writer of plays and songs (1838–1927)

- Died: February 13, 1927; Washington, D.C.
- Occupation: Writer

Nellie H. Bradley (c. 1838 – February 13, 1927) was an American writer of plays and songs in support of the temperance movement. She published her songs under the pen name Stella or Stella of Washington.

== Biography ==
She was the daughter of Henry Harper Hazard and Harriet Amanda Bibb Hazard, and she married Francis M. Bradley, an employee of the Bureau of Indian Affairs.

Nellie Bradley was superintendent of the Washington, D.C. chapter of the Woman's Christian Temperance Union (WCTU). She wrote numerous melodramatic, one-act plays dramatizing the dangers of alcohol consumption. These plays were not intended for professional theatre productions, but for amateur performances at temperance meetings and similar gatherings. She wrote the words to a number of temperance songs, set to music by E. A. Parkhurst, including the most famous of the genre, "Father's a Drunkard, and Mother Is Dead."

Bradley's crusades were not limited to alcohol. In 1887 she campaigned against the display in Washington cigar shops of reproductions of Alfred Alboy-Rebouet's painting of a scantly-clad woman, Night, then owned by the Corcoran Gallery of Art.

Nellie H. Bradley died on February 13, 1927, in Washington, D.C. at the age of 88.

== Bibliography ==
=== Plays ===
- The Young Teetotaler; or, Saved at Last (1867)
- The First Glass, or, The Power of Woman's Influence (1868)
- Marry No Man If He Drinks, or, Laura's Plan and How It Succeeded (1868)
- Reclaimed, or, The Danger of Moderate Drinking (1868)
- The Stumbling Block: Why a Deacon Gave Up His Wine (1871)
- Wine as a Medicine, or, Abbie’s Experience. (1873)
- A Temperance Picnic: With the Old Woman Who Lived in a Shoe (1888)

=== Songs ===
- "Don't Sell Poor Father Rum"
- "Father's a Drunkard, and Mother Is Dead."
- "I'll Marry No Man If He Drinks"
- "Let Me Die at Home"
