= Loretta Bradley =

American psychologist

Loretta Bradley born in 1943 is a professor and coordinator of education advisers to Texas Tech University. She was previously an associate professor at Vanderbilt University and vice-dean of Temple University. She earned her doctorate at Purdue University. Bradley is the former president of the American Counseling Association (ACA) and the Association for Counselor Education and Supervision (ACES).

Bradley is the author or co-author of 6 books and over 150 articles in journals and conferences. She was co-winner of the 2004 Research Award of the British Association for Counselling and Psychotherapy. She is the first American to receive this award.

In addition, Bradley was co-recipient of the ACA research award. Her book won the ACES Publication Award.

In 2004 and 2005, Bradley was invited to Shanghai, China as a lecturer. In 2003, she was selected as one of 25 advisors who have made significant contributions to the profession council from 1952 to 2001. The 25 advisers were featured in the book, Legends and Legacies. She was invited to participate in the Rosalynn Carter Mental Health Symposium at the Carter Presidential Center and the White House Conference on mental health issues chaired by Tipper Gore in 1999.

== Bibliography ==
- Bradley, Loretta; James R. Cheek; Gerald Parr; William Lan (2003). Using music therapy techniques to treat teacher burnout. (Research). Digital - American Mental Health Counselors Association. ASIN : B0008DRU6Q)}
- Bradley, Loretta; Kaylene Brown (2002). Reducing the stigma of mental illness. (Professional Exchange). Digital - American Mental Health Counselors Association. ASIN : B0008ERXVW
- Bradley, Loretta; Nicolas Ladhany (2000). Counselor Supervision: Principles, Process and Practice (Accelerated Development). Hardcover - Routledge. ISBN 978-1-56032-873-5.
- Bradley, Loretta; Elaine Jarchow; Beth Robinson (1999). All About Sex: The School Counselor's Guide to Handling Tough Adolescent Problems. Hardcover - Corwin Press. ISBN 978-0-8039-6692-5.
- Bradley, Loretta (1990). Counseling Midlife Career Changers. Paperback - Garrett Park Pr. ISBN 978-0-912048-70-3.
- Bradley, Loretta (1975). Career education and biological sciences. Houghton Mifflin. ISBN 978-0-395-20047-6.
