= John Bradley (d. 1844) =

English painter (1785–1844)

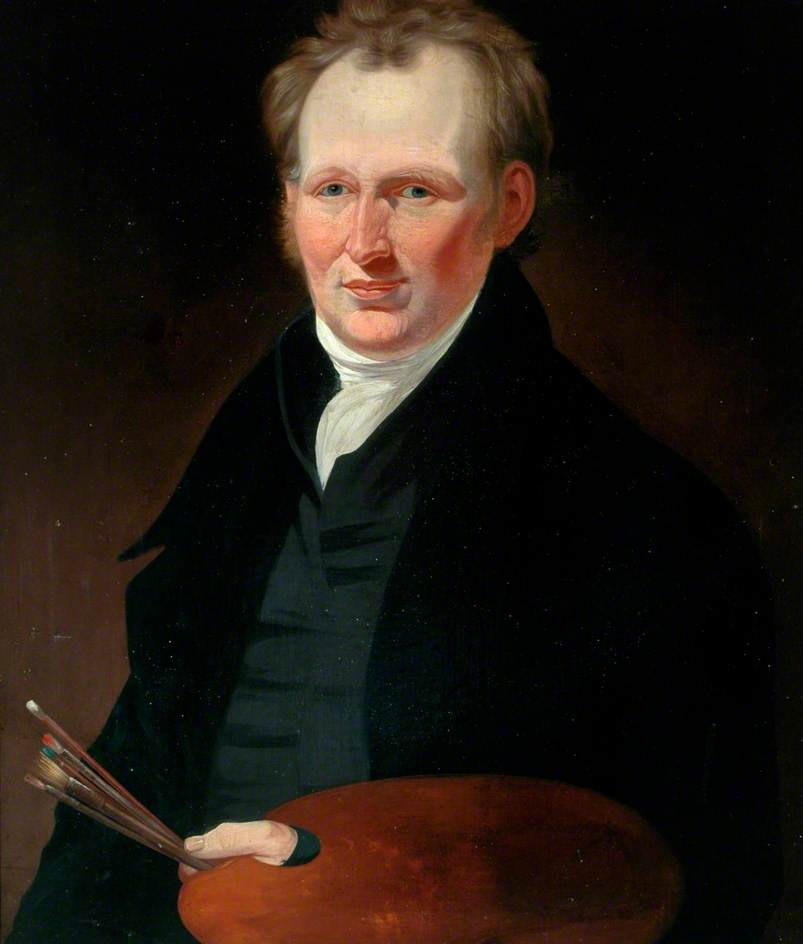
Self-portrait of John Bradley

John Bradley (1785–1844) was a British painter from Keighley in the West Riding of Yorkshire. He was a founder-member of the Keighley Mechanics Institute and was engaged as a drawing-master for the Brontë children in 1829–30.

He should not be confused with John Bradley, a British artist active in the New York area in the 1830s and 1840s, or John Bradley of Pall Mall, London (1786–1843), a printmaker and portraitist.

== Life and career ==
John Bradley was a native of Keighley, a town in Yorkshire some 4 miles (6.4 km) north east of Haworth where the Brontës had settled into the parsonage by 1820. Bradley worked as a house and sign painter, "but he preferred to call himself an artist". His work was exhibited at events sponsored by the Royal Northern Society for the Encouragement of the Fine Arts in the 1820s.

Bradley was a Freemason, joining Royal Yorkshire Lodge in 1813. In 1807 he made a sketch of a Knight Templar Tracing Board for Plains of Mamre Preceptory No.89 which was a cartoon for the famous Masonic Boards at Bottoms originally painted on to the shutters of The Freemasons' Arms and now on the walls of the Bottoms Lodge Room. Bradley was closely associated with the well-known clockmaker and Freemason John Barraclough (1773-1835) of Haworth and probably painted the dials on Barraclough’s longcase clocks including those with Masonic symbols.

In 1825, Bradley was one of four Keighley tradesmen who founded the Keighley Mechanics Institute. He was its first secretary and became vice-president in 1831.

The Reverend Patrick Brontë, a member of the Institute's library, engaged Bradley as drawing-master for his children Charlotte, Emily, Anne and their brother Branwell in the years 1829–1830. Bradley is likely to have encouraged Branwell in his enthusiasm for oil painting and architecture.

Bradley emigrated to the United States in July 1831 to pursue a career as a portrait painter in Philadelphia, but the venture was not a success. He returned to Keighley in 1833 and resumed his position in the Mechanics' Institute. He was the architect of a new home for the Institute, which was opened on 29 December 1834. The building later housed the Yorkshire Bank, and was demolished in 1968. Bradley died in 1844.
