= Percy Bradley =

English footballer (1887–1967)

Personal information
- Full name: Percy Bradley
- Date of birth: 25 August 1887
- Place of birth: Kingston upon Hull, England
- Date of death: 1967 (aged 79–80)
- Position: Goalkeeper

Youth career
- 1908–1910: Day Street Old Boys

Senior career*
Years	Team	Apps	(Gls)
1910–1913	Grimsby Town	6	(0)
1913–1914	Goole Town		
1914	Gainsborough Trinity		
- * Club domestic league appearances and goals

Percy Bradley (25 August 1887 – 1967) was an English professional footballer who played as a goalkeeper.
