= Milton Bradley (disambiguation) =

Milton Bradley (1836–1911) was an American business magnate and game pioneer.

Milton Bradley may also refer to:

- Milton Bradley (baseball) (born 1978), American professional baseball player
- Milton Bradley Company, a company founded by the game pioneer
- Milton-Bradley Company (building), a building in Springfield, Massachusetts, U.S.
- Milton Bradley (racehorse trainer) (1935–2023), British racehorse trainer
