= Matt Bradley =

Matt or Matthew Bradley may refer to:

== Sports ==
- Matt Bradley (ice hockey, born 1978) (born 1978), Canadian ice hockey player
- Matt Bradley (ice hockey, born 1997) (born 1997), Canadian-Italian ice hockey player
- Matt Bradley (American football) (1960–2002), American football player
- Matt Bradley (basketball) (born 1999), American basketball player

== Others ==
- Matthew Bradley, actor in the 1975 film Next Door
- Matt Bradley (The Goldbergs), character on the U.S. TV series The Goldbergs based on a real person
