= Robert Bradley (psychologist) =

American psychologist (born 1946)

Robert H. Bradley
- Born: July 14, 1946 (age 78)
- Citizenship: American
- Education: University of Notre Dame; University of North Carolina at Chapel Hill
- Known for: Research on early childhood education
- Scientific career
- Fields: Developmental psychology
- Institutions: University of Arkansas at Little Rock; University of Arkansas for Medical Sciences; Arizona State University
- Thesis: Sex, Race, Socio-economic Status, Locus-of-Control and Classroom Behavior among Junior High School Students (1974)

Robert Harold Bradley (born July 14, 1946) is an American psychologist. He is professor in the T. Denny Sanford School of Social & Family Dynamics and the Department of Psychology at Arizona State University (ASU), where he is also director of the Center for Child and Family Success. Before joining the faculty at ASU in 2009, he was a professor at the University of Arkansas at Little Rock and an adjunct professor at the University of Arkansas for Medical Sciences. He is a member of the Society for Research in Child Development and the National Council on Family Relations.
