= James Bradley (cricketer) =

English cricketer (1913–2001)

Personal information
- Full name: James Bradley
- Born: 3 October 1913; Pleasley, Nottinghamshire, England
- Died: January 2001 (aged 87); Mansfield, Nottinghamshire, England
- Batting: Unknown
- Bowling: Slow left-arm orthodox

Domestic team information
- Years: Team
- 1937–1939: Nottinghamshire

Career statistics
Competition	First-class
Matches	9
Runs scored	30
Batting average	6.00
100s/50s	–/–
Top score	13
Balls bowled	1,128
Wickets	19
Bowling average	41.10
5 wickets in innings	–
10 wickets in match	–
Best bowling	4/116
Catches/stumpings	4/–
- Source: Cricinfo, 19 May 2012

James Bradley (3 October 1913 – January 2001) was an English cricketer. Bradley's batting style is unknown, but it is known he bowled slow left-arm orthodox. He was born in Pleasley, Nottinghamshire.

Bradley made his first-class debut for Nottinghamshire against Surrey in the 1937 County Championship. He made eight further first-class appearances for the county, the last of which came against Kent in the 1939 County Championship. In his nine first-class appearances for the county, he took 19 wickets at an average of 41.10, with best figures of 4/116. With the bat, he scored 30 runs at a batting average of 6.00, with a high score of 13.

He died at Mansfield, Nottinghamshire in January 2001, aged 87.
