= Martin Bradley =

Martin Bradley may refer to:

- Martin Bradley (footballer) (1886–1958), English footballer
- Martin Bradley (cricketer) (born 1964), New Zealand cricketer
- Martin Bradley (painter) (1931–2023), British painter
- Martin R. Bradley (1888–1975), American politician from Michigan
- Martin Bradley (fictional character), fictional character on the Australian soap opera Home and Away
