= Mark Bradley (disambiguation) =

Mark Bradley (born 1982) is an American football wide receiver.

Mark Bradley may also refer to:

- Mark Edward Bradley (1907–1999), U.S. Air Force general
- Mark Bradley (footballer, born 1976), Scottish footballer
- Mark Bradley (footballer, born 1988), Welsh international footballer
- Mark Bradley (baseball) (1956–2024), American baseball player
- Mark Bradley (cricketer) (born 1966), New Zealand cricketer
- Mark Bradley (Gaelic footballer) (born 1994/95)

== See also ==
- Mark Bradly (born 1977), Australian rules footballer
