= Luther Bradley (disambiguation) =

Luther Bradley (born 1955) is a retired American football player.

Luther Bradley may also refer to:

- Luther D. Bradley (1853–1917), American cartoonist
- Luther Prentice Bradley (1822–1910), American Civil War officer
