= Murder of Dana Bradley =

Canadian unsolved murder

Dana Bradley
- Born: Dana Nicole Bradley; July 24, 1967; St. John's, Newfoundland and Labrador, Canada
- Died: December 14, 1981 (aged 14); St. John's, Newfoundland and Labrador, Canada
- Cause of death: Blunt force trauma
- Body discovered: December 18, 1981
- Known for: Victim of homicide

Dana Nicole Bradley was a 14-year-old girl who disappeared in St. John's, Newfoundland on 14 December 1981. Last seen hitchhiking on Topsail Road in St. John's, her body was discovered four days later in a wooded area south of the city. An intense and highly publicized investigation followed, and in 1986 a man confessed to her murder, but later recanted. As of 2026, the case remains open and unsolved.

== Disappearance and investigation ==
Bradley disappeared on the evening of 14 December 1981, while hitchhiking on Topsail Road in St. John's. She had been at a friend's home after school and was on her way home to a family birthday party. When she did not arrive, the family reported her missing to the Royal Newfoundland Constabulary. An eyewitness reported seeing Bradley getting into a car with a male driver.

Bradley's body was found by Dale Smith in a wooded area on Maddox Cove Road south of St. John's four days after she disappeared. Her skull had been fractured by a blunt object and she had been sexually assaulted. The body was laid out in "burial fashion" with her schoolbooks tucked under her arm.

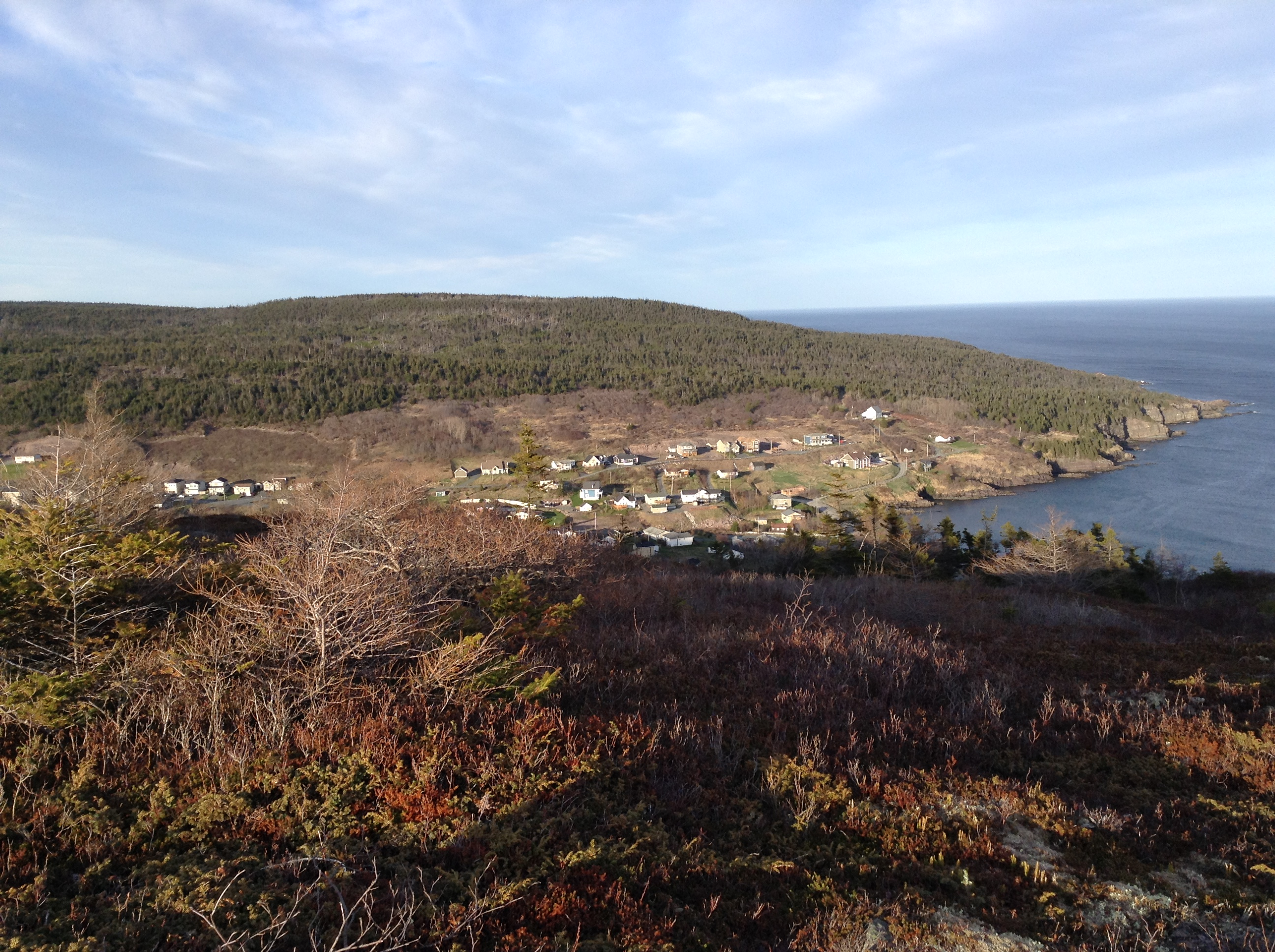
Petty Harbour-Maddox Cove, NL

The subsequent investigation has been described as (then) "the most expensive and exhaustive murder investigation in Canadian history". Hundreds of people were interviewed; thousands of tips were received and investigated. More than 800 cars were examined in the weeks following Bradley's disappearance. The initial task force was composed of 35 full-time investigators from the RCMP and Royal Newfoundland Constabulary.

In 1986, David Grant Somerton was charged with Bradley's murder after confessing to police. However, he later recanted the confession, alleging that it had been coerced, and the murder charges against him were stayed. Somerton was later convicted of public mischief in relation to the false confession and sentenced to two years imprisonment.

In 2006, the RCMP reported that they were still receiving approximately 50 tips a year in relation to the Bradley homicide case.

== 2016 investigations ==
=== Vehicle recovery ===
In May 2016, a privately funded group conducted an excavation of two buried vehicles on private property in the Witless Bay area near St. John's. The group members were supporters of an alleged eyewitness to the homicide, who claimed to have been in the car as a child when Bradley was abducted. The car allegedly belonged to the father of the eyewitness, who claimed it was being driven by a family friend at the time. This car was later buried as landfill and was one of the two vehicles excavated. The RCMP investigated the eyewitness claims for 16 months before dismissing them; however, the witness and his supporters continued to lobby the RCMP to excavate the vehicles.

Subsequent to the excavation it was determined that no usable evidence was found in either vehicle, due to extensive degradation of the vehicles during the time period in which they were buried (nearly 30 years), and contamination from sewage runoff and other chemicals.

=== New DNA evidence ===
In May 2016, the RCMP announced that they had uncovered new DNA evidence in the Bradley case. Retesting of a sample recovered in 1981 connected the homicide to an unknown male subject. The new DNA evidence was also used to rule out existing suspects, including the man alleged to be responsible in connection with the private excavation of the two vehicles that month.

== Popular culture ==
Bradley's disappearance and death captivated the Newfoundland public.

In 1991, the Newfoundland Broadcasting Corporation re-enacted her case over several days during the evening news.

In 2003, author Darrin McGrath published a history of the case, Hitching a Ride: The Unsolved Murder of Dana Bradley.

Also in 2003, singer/songwriter Ron Hynes released a song about her death, entitled "The Ghost of Dana Bradley".

== See also ==
- Lists of solved missing person cases
- List of unsolved murders (1980–1999)
