= George Bradley (journalist) =

English journalist

George Bradley (1816–1863), was an English journalist.

Bradley was born at Whitby in Yorkshire in 1816, and apprenticed to a firm of printers in his native town. After working for several years as a reporter on the York Herald he was appointed editor of the Sunderland and Durham County Herald, and about 1848 became editor and one of the proprietors of the Newcastle Guardian. He resided at Newcastle until his death on 14 October 1863, being greatly respected, and for a considerable period an influential member of the town council. Bradley published A Concise and Practical System of Short-hand Writing, with a brief History of the Progress of the Art. Illustrated by sixteen engraved lessons and exercises, London, 1843, 12mo. The system is a variation of William Fordyce Mavor's.
