= William Lee Bradley =

American theologian

The Reverend Doctor William Lee Bradley (September 6, 1918 – April 29, 2007, born in Oakland, California), was a scholar of comparative religion, ethics, and theology, as well as a philanthropist.

== Early life and education ==
Bradley was born in Oakland to Kathryn Lee Culver, an author and artist, and Dwight Jaques Bradley, author and Congregational Church leader. He was raised in El Paso, Texas, Webster Groves, Missouri, and Newton Centre, Massachusetts. In 1947, he married Paula Anne Elliott, later a New Hampshire State Representative (1992–98; 2000–02). He received his B.A. from Oberlin College (1941), B.D. from Andover Newton Theological School (1950), and Ph.D. from University of Edinburgh, Scotland (1949). He was a Sergeant in the United States Army Air Corps in World War II (1942–45), serving in the South Pacific.

== Career ==
A fifth-generation ordained minister in the Congregational Christian Churches (later merging to become the United Church of Christ), he served as a professor at Hartford Seminary from 1950 to 1966. He was a visiting professor at Thammasat University in Bangkok, Thailand for the last three years of his tenure at Hartford. In Bangkok, he served on the field staff of The Rockefeller Foundation and researched his ancestor, the Dr. Dan Beach Bradley, the first medical missionary to Siam and court physician to Siam's King Mongkut and his son, King Chulalongkorn.

After his time at Hartford, Bradley took a position at the Rockefeller Foundation as associate director for the Arts, Humanities, and Social Sciences, from 1966 to 1971, and was then President of the Edward W. Hazen Foundation in New Haven, Connecticut from 1971 to 1984. At The Rockefeller Foundation, he was particularly proud of his work assisting emerging playwrights and theatres in the heyday of the Off-Off-Broadway theatre movement in New York City in the late 1960s and early 1970s, assisting such emerging talents as playwrights Julie Bovasso, Maria Irene Fornes, John Guare, Sam Shepard, Ron Whyte, and Lanford Wilson, as well as theatres such as the artistic leadership of producers such as Ellen Stewart (La MaMa Experimental Theatre Company or LaMaMa, E.T.C.), Joseph Papp (New York Shakespeare Festival - The Public Theater), Wyn Handman (The American Place Theatre), Joe Cino (Caffe Cino), and the theatre at St. Mark's Church in-the-Bowery. His theatre involvement continued in the 1980s when he served as chair of the Board of Circle Repertory Company in New York City. As President of the Hazen Foundation, he was known for taking creative philanthropic risks by providing crucial seed funding for innovative programs and organizations that often later attracted substantial funding from larger foundations. The reach and influence of the Hazen Foundation under his leadership, therefore, was amplified well beyond the value of the grants awarded.

While in Connecticut, Bradley also served on the Governor's Commissions on Human Services; Libraries; and Equity and Excellence in Education. Following his retirement from the Hazen Foundation, which he continued to serve as President Emeritus, William and Paula moved to Randolph, New Hampshire, where both became active in that community. Bradley co-founded and served as the first editor of the Mountain View, a quarterly news magazine in Randolph, served as President of the Randolph Foundation from 1991 to 1996, and continued his lifelong activity in Democratic Party politics on the local and statewide level.

== Publications ==
Bradley was the author of many articles and several books, including P.T. Forsyth: The Man and His Work, The Meaning of Christian Values Today, Introduction to Comparative Religion, and Siam Then: The Foreign Colony in Bangkok Before and After Anna. He was the coauthor of Thailand: Domino By Default? He remained active in ministry throughout his career, performing weddings and funerals for several generations of friends and family in the several communities he and Paula called home.

Bradley died in Concord, New Hampshire at Havenwood-Heritage Heights Health Services Center on April 29, 2007, of complications from Alzheimer's disease.

== See also ==
- Dan Beach Bradley
