= Elizabeth Bradley (drama professor) =

American drama professor

Elizabeth Bradley (born 1955, Canada) is a drama professional and educator appointed Chair of the Department of Drama, Tisch School of the Arts, New York University, United States, on 1 June 2008. She chairs the US board of the National Theatre of Scotland.

== Education ==
Bradley earned her BFA degree in theatre from York University in Toronto.

== Professional appointments ==
Bradley worked as a programming consultant for the National Arts Centre in Ottawa before her first major appointment as CEO of the Hummingbird Centre for the Performing Arts in Toronto, the largest in Canada, where she served for a decade in the 1990s. She also worked as general manager and director of communications and special projects at the Stratford Shakespeare Festival of Canada.

In 2001, she played a key role in the creation of the Inaugural International Arts Forum in Beijing, People's Republic of China. The same year, she began a seven-year stint in her first post in the United States, as Head of Drama at Carnegie Mellon University.

She was the founding artistic director of the Pittsburgh International Festival of Firsts in 2004.

On 1 June 2008, she took up her appointment as Chair of the Department of Drama at the Tisch School of the Arts, New York University, as part of a three-year appointment in that position, extended till at least 2016.

She is a former Chair of the International Society for the Performing Arts Foundation in the United States.

Bradley has produced several acclaimed stage shows.

== Awards ==
Bradley is a recipient of the Queen's Jubilee Gold Medal for outstanding contribution to the arts in Canada.
