= Peter Bradley =

Peter Bradley may refer to:

== Religious figures ==
- Peter Bradley (archdeacon) (born 1949), British Anglican priest and archdeacon of Warrington
- Peter Bradley (dean) (born 1964), British Anglican priest and dean of Sheffield

== Others ==
- Peter Bradley (cricketer) (born 1937), English cricketer
- Peter Bradley (politician) (born 1953), English politician
- Peter Bradley (artist) (born 1940), American painter and sculptor
- Pete Bradley, character in the 1997 film Defying Gravity

== See also ==
- Peter Bradley Adams, folk-pop Americana singer-songwriter
