= Robert B. Bradley =

American academic

Dr. Robert Bradley
- Education: University of Florida
- Known for: Serving as Vice President at Florida State University
- Awards: American Society for Public Administration award

Robert B. Bradley is the Vice President for Planning and Programs at Florida State University.

Bradley is in charge of the university’s budget and is responsible for academic planning. He also serves as Director of the Institute of Science and Public Affairs (ISPA). He is also a professor at the Askew School of Public Administration and Policy.

== Career ==
Bradley has been a member of FSU's faculty since 1998. He is the Director of the Institute of Science and Public Affairs (ISPA).

== Education ==
- Bachelor's degree in physics from the University of Florida.
- Doctorate in political science also from the University of Florida.

== Awards ==
Bradley received the Public Administrator of the year awards from the North Florida Chapter of the American Society for Public Administration that covers the state capital.
