= Henry Roswell Bradley =

American politician (1832–1870)

Henry Roswell Bradley (May 7, 1832 – July 22, 1870) was an American politician.

He was the youngest son of Roswell and Julia (Newell) Bradley, and was born in Southington, Connecticut, on May 7, 1832. He graduated from Yale College in 1853. After graduating, he studied law, first in the Law School at New Haven, and then with Hon. W. W. Eaton of Hartford. From 1855 until his death, he practiced law in his native town. Though laboring under great embarrassment from physical defects, he became a prominent man in the town, holding successively the offices of Town Clerk, Treasurer, Registrar, and Judge of Probate. He twice represented the town in the Connecticut State Legislature, and was a member of the Connecticut Senate in 1863. Bradley was never married.

He died in Southington, Connecticut, on July 22, 1870, aged 38.
