= J. Robert Bradley =

American gospel music singer

John Robert Lee Bradley (October 5, 1919 – May 3, 2007) was an American gospel music singer. He was the favorite singer of the Rev. Dr. Martin Luther King Jr. and was nicknamed "Mr. Baptist". Mahalia Jackson once said he had the greatest voice she had ever heard, stating "Nobody need mess with 'Amazing Grace' after Bradley gets through with it."

Born in Memphis, Tennessee, his singing at age 12 caught the attention of Lucie Campbell, who arranged for him to join her Good Will Singers quartet. After touring with them, he studied classical music in New York and London, where he lived for six years. For a number of years he gave classical concerts singing German Lieder, although he recorded none of his classical repertoire. He recorded his first record with Apollo Records in 1950. Apollo 211's sides were "Didn't My Lord Deliver Daniel", and "If Jesus Had to Pray". At the same session for Apollo, Bradley recorded the unreleased "Must Jesus Bear the Cross Alone", "Poor Pilgrim of Sorrow, Lord Hear my Plea", and a magisterial reading of "He's Got the Whole World in His Hands". Twelve years later Bradley recorded lp's for Battle Records (1962), Decca Records (1965) and Nashboro Records ("I'll Fly Away", 1974).

In 1997, he recorded several cuts for Tony Heilbut's collection All God's Sons & Daughters: Chicago Gospel Legends, which Heilbut's Spirit Feel label released in 1999. After Campbell's death, he succeeded her as National Baptist Convention director of music.

== Death ==
Bradley died on May 3, 2007, from complications of diabetes in Nashville, Tennessee.
