= Foghorn Bradley =

American baseball player and umpire (1855–1900)

- Pitcher/Umpire
- Born: July 1, 1855; Medford, Massachusetts, US
- Died: March 31, 1900 (aged 44); Philadelphia, Pennsylvania, US
- Batted: Right Threw: Right

MLB debut
- August 23, 1876, for the Boston Red Caps

Last MLB appearance
- October 21, 1876, for the Boston Red Caps

MLB statistics
- Win–loss record: 9–10
- Earned run average: 2.49
- Strikeouts: 16
- Stats at Baseball Reference

Teams
- Boston Red Caps (1876)

Career highlights and awards
- Called two no-hitters, including Lee Richmond's perfect game

George H. "Foghorn" Bradley (July 1, 1855 – March 31, 1900) was an American umpire in Major League Baseball for six full seasons who was born in Medford, Massachusetts. He also played one season in the National League.

== Playing career ==
Bradley played his only season in the major leagues in 1876 for the Boston Red Caps, after having been a late-season signing by Harry Wright. He started 21 of the team's last 22 games that season, becoming the team's ace. His totals for the season included nine wins and 10 losses in 22 games pitched. He started 21 games, completing 16 of them including one shutout. After the season, Wright signed Tommy Bond, and Bradley suspected that Bond would be the team's new ace, so he signed a lucrative minor league contract and left the National League, never to return as a player.

== Umpiring career ==
The following season, he did not continue to play, but instead served as a replacement umpire, as he had in 1875 in the National Association. He did not get promoted to full-time umpire until 1879, when he officiated games in the National League until 1883. He would again umpire in the majors in the American Association in 1886. During that era, umpires generally worked games single-handedly, and Bradley was no exception; he worked as the lone umpire in every game of his career.

Although his career as an umpire was short, he was involved in several historic games. On June 12, 1880, he was the umpire when Lee Richmond pitched the first perfect game in major league history, which was also the second no-hitter ever tossed. Later, in that same season, on August 20, he was the umpire for another no-hitter, this time by future Hall of Famer Pud Galvin, throwing the fifth no-hitter in major league history.

In total, he officially umpired in 344 games, during an era in which more than one umpire was rarely used in games. Bradley died in Philadelphia at the age of 44, and was buried in the Philadelphia Cemetery. He was later re-buried in Forest Hills Cemetery in Huntingdon Valley, Pennsylvania.
