= Fred Winchester Sladen =

United States Army general

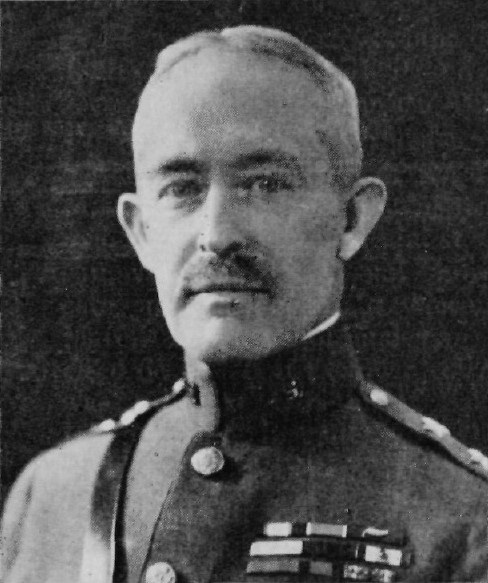
- Fred W. Sladen
- Born: February 22, 1867; Lowell, Massachusetts, U.S.
- Died: July 10, 1945 (aged 78); New London, New Hampshire, U.S.
- Burial place: West Point Cemetery
- Military career
- Allegiance: United States of America
- Branch: United States Army
- Service years: 1890–1931
- Rank: Major General
- Service number: 0-78
- Commands: Superintendent of the United States Military Academy; Philippine Department
- Conflicts: Philippine–American War; World War I
- Awards: Distinguished Service Cross; Army Distinguished Service Medal; Croix de Guerre

Fred Winchester Sladen (November 24, 1867 – July 10, 1945) was a career United States Army officer who rose to the rank of major general and became Superintendent of the United States Military Academy. He was a son of English-born Joseph A. Sladen (1841-1911) and Martha F. Winchester. The elder Sladen met with Cochise in the company of General Oliver Otis Howard, and was awarded the Medal of Honor for his service in the American Civil War.

== Early life ==
Sladen was born on November 24, 1867, in Lowell, Massachusetts, the son of Joseph Alton Sladen and Martha (Winchester) Sladen.

== Education ==
Sladen received his appointment to the US Military Academy from the State of Nebraska, graduating 27th out of 54 in his class of 1890.

== Military career ==
Sladen began his military career commissioned an officer in the Infantry branch upon graduating from the US Military Academy. From 1911 to 1914 he was commandant of cadets.

During World War I, Sladen served as commander of the 5th Infantry Brigade, part of the Third Infantry Division. He was awarded the Distinguished Service Cross and the Distinguished Service Medal for his wartime service. On October 14, 1918, learning that his brigade's advance had stalled near Ferme de la Madeleine, France, Sladen proceeded three kilometers to the front lines under heavy enemy fire to investigate. Discovering that the battalion commander had been killed, he took direct command himself and was able to resume the attack.

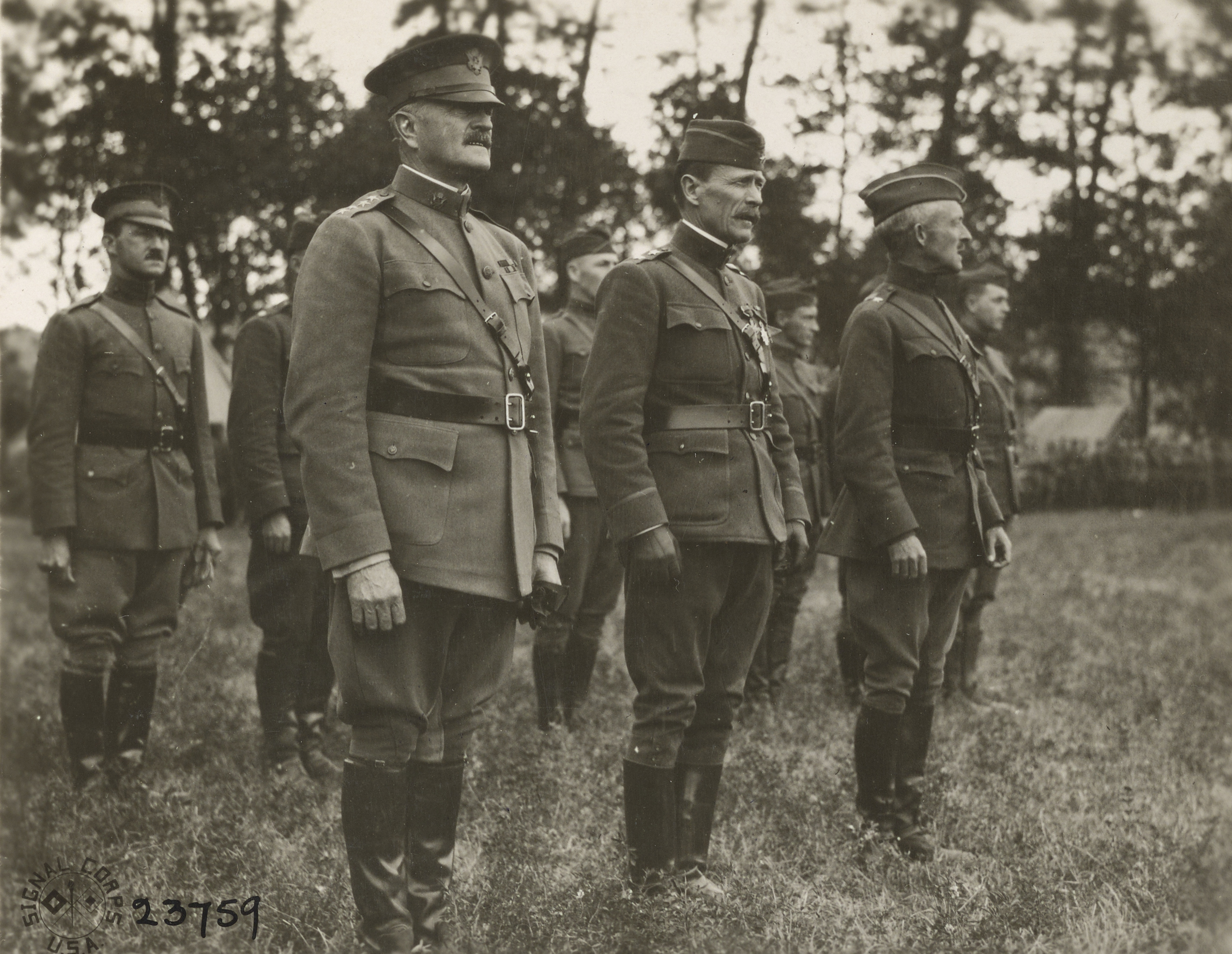
General John J. Pershing, Major General Beaumont B. Buck, and Brigadier General Fred W. Sladen inspecting the Guard of Honor of the 3rd Battalion, 7th Infantry Regiment, 3rd Division, Vaucouleurs, France, 1918.

He served in the army until his retirement on November 30, 1931. He achieved the rank of major general and was the 32nd superintendent of the US Military Academy from 1922 to 1926. He served as Third Corps Area commander from September 1928 to August 1931. He later served as superintendent of Fort McHenry from 1931 to 1932.

== Personal life ==
Sladen married Ms. Elizabeth Lefferts of New York City on October 8, 1903, at the Church of the Holy Incarnation on Madison Avenue. One of Sladen's groomsmen was another future West Point Superintendent, William D. Connor. Their son Fred Winchester Sladen Jr. was a West Point graduate and decorated battalion commander during World War II who retired as a brigadier general.

== Death ==
Sladen died in New London, New Hampshire, on July 10, 1945.

Military offices
Preceded by Douglas MacArthur	Superintendents of the United States Military Academy; 1922–1925	Succeeded by Merch Bradt Stewart
