= Rebecca Bradley (bandit) =

American bank robber

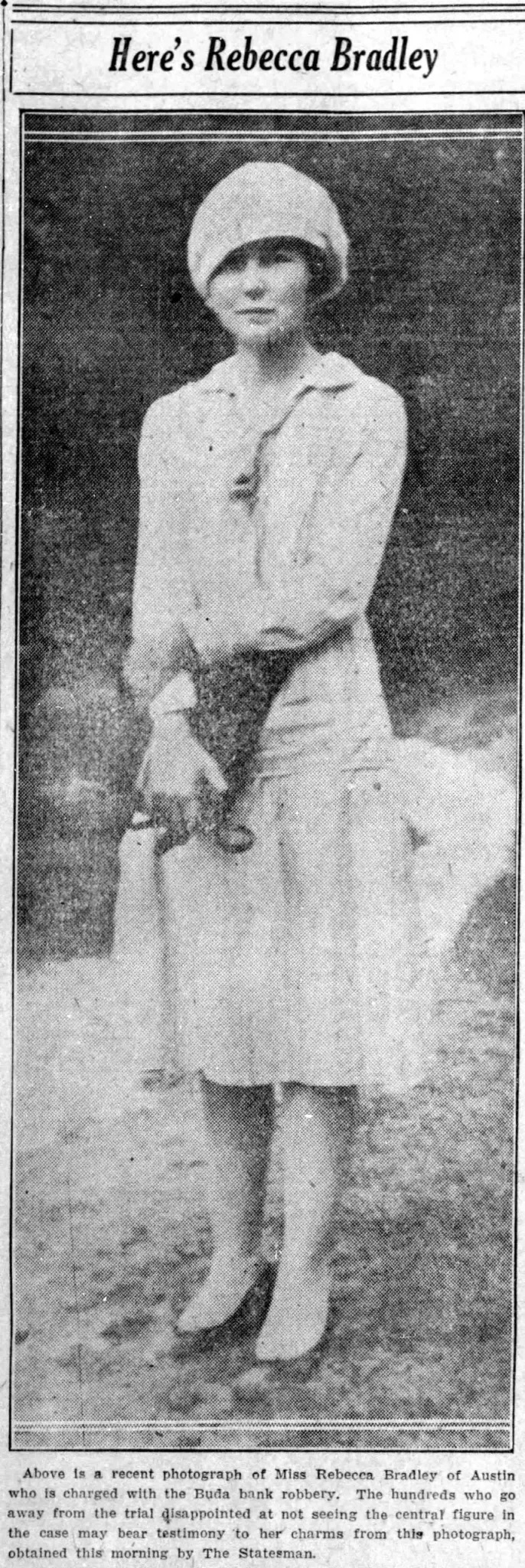
- Born: c. 1905; Texarkana, Arkansas, US
- Died: 1950; Fort Worth, Texas, US
- Education: Central High School; University of Texas at Austin
- Children: 3
- Criminal charges: armed bank robbery

Rebecca Bradley (born c. 1905, died 1950), also known as the Texas "Flapper Bandit", was an American bank robber whose crime was widely covered in the press.

== Life ==
Bradley was born in Texarkana, Arkansas around 1905. She was educated at the Central High School in Fort Worth, Texas.

In 1926, Bradley was studying towards a degree in American history at the University of Texas at Austin, whilst working as an assistant to a university professor Charles Ramsdell who handled the business and financial affairs for the Texas State Historical Association. She also served as the vice president of her local chapter of the Present Day Club, which was a women's organisation dedicated to reducing crime and supporting prohibition. She drove her own car.

Bradley was married in secret to her high school sweetheart and law student, Otis Rogers, at the courthouse in Georgetown, Texas in 1925. Her mother lost her job, leaving Bradley supporting them both. She struggled financially and got into debt.

After failing in an attempted robbery of the Farmers’ State Bank in Round Rock, on 11 December 1926 Bradley drove to the Farmer's National Bank of Buda. She posed as a reporter for the Beaumont Enterprise newspaper and convinced the cashier Frank Jamison to allow her to use a typewriter inside the tellers’ cages. She pulled a gun on the bank employees, locked two male bank employees in the safe and stole $2,000. She fled in her car, taking back roads back to Austin, but a Buda resident recorded her car license plate.

After her arrest, she was taken to San Marcos for booking. The sheriff later claimed that she laughed about her arrest and said: "I have a whole lot to live down, but not as much as those men back there who let a little girl hold them up with an empty gun."

Bradley initially denied being married, until her husband arrived to be her defense. He arranged for his wife to be examined by three psychologists and they testified that she was suffering from dementia praecox (now known as schizophrenia) and that she could not tell right from wrong. Linda Coker, chair of the Hays County Historical Commission, says that when Bradley was put on trial, one of the judges believed she "was so pretty that there's no way she could be a criminal." Bradley also supposedly charmed the all-male jury with her "melting brown eyes." She was eventually cleared of the crime, after four separate trials.

Her crime and arrest caused a media sensation, and papers dubbed her the "Flapper Bandit." Other headlines included "Boy Orator to defend Bandit Wife" and "Girl with Pistol Robs bank in Texas."

After her release, she became Becky Rogers, taking her husband's surname, and led a quiet life as a wife and mother to three children. She supported her husband by working as his legal secretary. She died in 1950.
